= List of craters on Mars: O–Z =

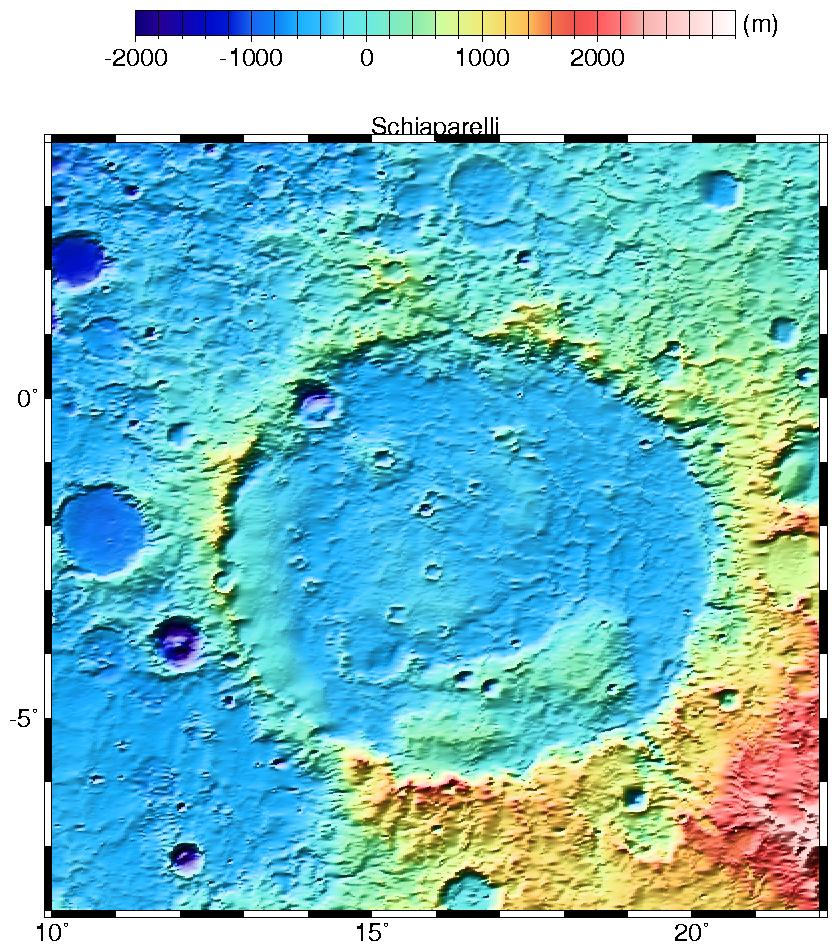
Elevation map of crater Schiaparelli imaged by MGS

This is a list of craters on Mars. There are hundreds of thousands of impact craters on Mars, but only some of them have names. This list here contains only named Martian craters starting with the letter O – Z (see also lists for A – G and H – N).

Large Martian craters (greater than 60 kilometers in diameter) are named after famous scientists and science fiction authors; smaller ones (less than 60 km in diameter) get their names from towns on Earth. Craters cannot be named for living people, and small crater names are not intended to be commemorative – that is, a small crater isn't actually named after a specific town on Earth, but rather its name comes at random from a pool of terrestrial place names, with some exceptions made for craters near landing sites. Latitude and longitude are given as planetographic coordinates with west longitude.

== O ==
Crater	Coordinates	Diameter (km)	Approval date	Named after	Refs
Obock	2.0°S 209.5°W	14.5	2013	Djibouti place name	WGPSN
Ocampo	33.0°N 221.8°W	7.1	1991	Mexico place name	WGPSN
Ochakov	42.5°S 31.9°W	33.3	1976	Ukraine place name	WGPSN
Oglala	3.2°S 38.2°W	18.2	1976	USA (South Dakota) place name	WGPSN
Ohara	4.93°N 277.59°W	10.8	2006	Japan place name	WGPSN
Oituz	23.46°N 341.24°W	15.3	2018	Oituz, Romania	WGPSN
Okhotsk	23.2°N 47.4°W	1.2	1979	Okhotsk, Russia	WGPSN
Okotoks	21.2°S 275.7°W	22.6	2006	Canada (Alberta) place name	WGPSN
Olenek	20.1°N 54.3°W	3.0	1988	Russia place name	WGPSN
Olom	23.2°N 57.8°W	6.0	1988	Russia place name	WGPSN
Ome	20.8°N 256.0°W	2.9	1988	Japan place name	WGPSN
Ōmura	25.6°S 25.3°W	8.4	1976	Japan place name	WGPSN
Onon	16.3°N 257.6°W	3.5	1988	Onon, Mongolia	WGPSN
Oodnadatta	52.8°S 34.2°W	27.0	1991	South Australia place name	WGPSN
Oraibi	17.4°N 32.4°W	33.0	1976	USA (Arizona) place name	WGPSN
Ore	17.0°N 34.0°W	7.0	1976	Nigeria place name	WGPSN
Orinda	45.7°N 233.1°W	9.8	1979	USA (California) place name	WGPSN
Orson Welles	0.2°S 45.9°W	124.5	2003	Orson Welles	WGPSN
Ostrov	26.8°S 28.2°W	73.0	1976	Russia place name	WGPSN
Ottumwa	24.8°N 55.8°W	53.2	1976	USA (Iowa) place name	WGPSN
Oudemans	10.0°S 91.9°W	124.0	1973	Jean Abraham Chrétien Oudemans	WGPSN
Ouarzazate	42.66°N 328.81°W	22.0	2026	Town in Morocco	WGPSN
Oyama	23.66°N 20.17°W	106.8	2010	Vance Oyama	WGPSN

back to top

== P ==
Crater	Coordinates	Diameter (km)	Approval date	Named after	Refs
Pabo	27.2°S 23.1°W	8.9	1976	Uganda place name	WGPSN
Pai	41.1°S 37.6°W	42	2017	Pai, Thailand	WGPSN
Paks	7.7°S 42.1°W	6.8	1976	Hungary place name	WGPSN
Pal	31.31°S 251.4°W	79.0	2010	George Pal	WGPSN
Palana	21.3°N 258.0°W	5.1	1988	Settlement of Palana in Kamchatka Krai, Russia.	WGPSN
Palos	2.7°S 249.2°W	55.1	2000	Spain place name	WGPSN
Pangboche	17.22°N 133.62°W	10.4	2006	Pangboche, Nepal	WGPSN
Papike	43.77°S 31.06°W	67.0	2025	James J. Papike	WGPSN
Paros	22.2°N 98.2°W	34.1	1988	Paros, Greece	WGPSN
Pasteur	19.4°N 335.5°W	113.0	1973	Louis Pasteur	WGPSN
Pau	55.42°S 300.75°W	44.8	2006	France place name	WGPSN
Pebas	2.57°S 0.96°W	5.2	2006	Peru place name	WGPSN
Peixe	20.5°N 47.7°W	10.3	1976	Brazil place name	WGPSN
Penticton	38.35°S 263.35°W	8.0	2008	Penticton, Canada	WGPSN
Perepelkin	52.8°N 64.6°W	112.0	1973	Yevgeny Perepyolkin	WGPSN
Peridier	25.7°N 276.2°W	100.0	1973	Julien Peridier	WGPSN
Perrotin	2.9°S 78.0°W	84.0	1988	Henri Perrotin	WGPSN
Persbo	8.54°N 203.24°W	19.5	2006	Persbo, Sweden	WGPSN
Peta	21.5°S 9.2°W	80.5	1997	Greece place name	WGPSN
Pettit	12.3°N 174.0°W	98.1	1973	Edison Pettit	WGPSN
Phedra	13.82°N 236.22°W	21.3	2008	Suriname place name	WGPSN
Philadelphia	22.0°N 48.1°W	1.6	1979	Philadelphia, Pennsylvania, USA	WGPSN
Phillips	66.7°S 45.1°W	190.2	1973	John Phillips (geologist) and Theodore E. Phillips	WGPSN
Phon	15.7°N 257.3°W	9.7	1976	Phon District, Khon Kaen, Thailand	WGPSN
Pica	20.0°N 53.3°W	2.2	1988	Chile place name	WGPSN
Pickering	33.9°S 132.8°W	115.0	1973	Edward Charles Pickering and William Henry Pickering	WGPSN
Piña	18.6°N 248.3°W	5.1	1988	Panama place name	WGPSN
Pinglo	3.0°S 36.9°W	17.4	1976	China place name	WGPSN
Pital	9.4°S 62.3°W	41.7	2014	Costa Rica place name	WGPSN
Piyi	23.1°S 253.5°W	11.4	1991	Cyprus place name	WGPSN
Pizzarello	40.95°S 28.89°W	97.0	2025	Sandra Pizzarello	WGPSN
Platte	16.2°N 246.9°W	3.3	1988	USA (South Dakota) place name	WGPSN
Playfair	78.1°S 126.2°W	64.2	1973	John Playfair	WGPSN
Plum	26.3°S 19.1°W	2.5	1976	USA (Wisconsin) place name	WGPSN
Podor	44.5°S 43.2°W	24.0	1976	Podor, Senegal	WGPSN
Pohl	34.04°N 37.0°W	111.0	2022	Frederik Pohl	WGPSN
Pollack	7.9°S 334.8°W	96.0	1997	James B. Pollack	WGPSN
Polotsk	20.1°S 26.4°W	31.5	1976	City Polotsk in Vitebsk Region of Belarus	WGPSN
Pompeii	19.1°N 59.2°W	32.4	1988	Pompeii, Italy	WGPSN
Poona	24.0°N 52.4°W	20.0	1986	Pune, India	WGPSN
Port-au-Prince	21.3°N 48.3°W	0.5	1979	Port-au-Prince, Haiti	WGPSN
Porter	50.8°S 113.9°W	105.0	1973	Russell W. Porter	WGPSN
Porth	21.4°N 255.9°W	9.3	1976	Porth, Wales	WGPSN
Portsmouth	22.8°N 49.2°W	0.9	1979	Portsmouth, New Hampshire, USA	WGPSN
Porvoo	43.6°S 40.9°W	9.8	1976	Porvoo, Finland	WGPSN
Poti	36.6°S 273.5°W	31.0	1991	Georgia place name	WGPSN
Poynting	8.4°N 112.9°W	74.0	1988	John Henry Poynting	WGPSN
Prao	11.3°S 303.4°W	20.0	2016	Vietnam place name	WGPSN
Priestley	54.4°S 229.4°W	41.9	1973	Joseph Priestley	WGPSN
Princeton	21.9°N 49.2°W	1.8	1979	Princeton, New Jersey, USA	WGPSN
Proctor	48.0°S 330.5°W	168.2	1973	Richard A. Proctor	WGPSN
Ptolemaeus	46.2°S 157.6°W	185.0	1973	Ptolemy	WGPSN
Puławy	36.8°S 76.7°W	51.5	1979	Poland place name	WGPSN
Puńsk	20.8°N 41.2°W	11.6	1976	Puńsk, Poland	WGPSN
Pursat	37.35°S 229.34°W	18.3	2009	Cambodia place name	WGPSN
Puyo	83.79°N 222.31°W	10.4	2006	Ecuador place name	WGPSN
Pylos	17.0°N 30.2°W	19.1	1976	Greece place name	WGPSN

back to top

== Q ==
Crater	Coordinates	Diameter (km)	Approval date	Named after	Refs
Qara	16.43°N 209.7°W	2.5	2018	Qara Oasis, Egypt	WGPSN
Qibā	17.3°N 257.0°W	3.9	1988	Saudi Arabia place name	WGPSN
Quenisset	34.6°N 319.4°W	138.0	1973	Ferdinand Quénisset	WGPSN
Quick	18.4°N 49.3°W	13.4	1976	Canada (British Columbia) place name	WGPSN
Quines	42.2°S 270.9°W	10.9	1991	Argentina place name	WGPSN
Quorn	5.6°S 33.7°W	5.9	1976	South Australia place name	WGPSN
Quthing	0.4°N 210.7°W	15.6	2013	Lesotho place name	WGPSN

back to top

== R ==
Crater	Coordinates	Diameter (km)	Approval date	Named after	Refs
Rabe	43.9°S 325.1°W	108.0	1973	Wilhelm F. Rabe	WGPSN
Radau	17.1°N 4.8°W	114.5	1973	Rodolphe Radau	WGPSN
Raga	48.4°S 117.6°W	3.4	2011	South Sudan place name	WGPSN
Rahe	25.3°N 97.6°W	34.1	2000	Jürgen Rahe (3537 Jürgen § Naming)	WGPSN
Rakke	4.6°S 43.4°W	19.2	1976	Estonia place name	WGPSN
Rana	25.9°S 21.9°W	12.2	1976	Norway place name	WGPSN
Raub	42.7°N 225.0°W	7.1	1979	Malaysia place name	WGPSN
Rauch	21.8°N 58.2°W	34.1	1976	Argentina place name	WGPSN
Rauna	35.6°N 32.1°W	2.5	2015	Latvia place name	WGPSN
Rayadurg	18.6°S 257.7°W	21.8	1991	India place name	WGPSN
Rayleigh	75.6°S 240.9°W	148.7	1973	Lord Rayleigh	WGPSN
Redi	60.6°S 267.3°W	62.0	1973	Francesco Redi	WGPSN
Renaudot	42.4°N 297.4°W	64.0	1973	Gabrielle Renaudot Flammarion	WGPSN
Rengo	43.8°S 43.7°W	13.0	1976	Chile place name	WGPSN
Resen	28.22°S 251.13°W	7.4	2011	Resen, North Macedonia	WGPSN
Reutov	45.4°S 157.7°W	18.0	2013	Russia place name	WGPSN
Reuyl	9.8°S 193.2°W	85.9	1973	Dirk Reuyl	WGPSN
Revda	24.5°S 28.5°W	27.0	1976	Russia place name	WGPSN
Reykholt	40.8°N 86.3°W	53.2	1991	Iceland place name	WGPSN
Reynolds	75.1°S 157.9°W	97.5	1973	Osborne Reynolds	WGPSN
Ribe	16.6°N 29.2°W	11.0	1976	Denmark place name	WGPSN
Richardson	72.6°S 180.4°W	95.9	1973	Lewis Fry Richardson	WGPSN
Rimac	45.3°N 224.0°W	7.6	1979	Peru place name	WGPSN
Rincon	8.1°S 43.1°W	13.6	1976	Netherlands Antilles place name	WGPSN
Ritchey	28.8°S 51.0°W	79.0	1973	George Willis Ritchey	WGPSN
Robert Sharp	4.17°S 133.42°W	152.08	2012	Robert P. Sharp	WGPSN
Roddenberry	49.8°S 4.6°W	141.0	1994	Gene Roddenberry	WGPSN
Roddy	21.9°S 39.4°W	85.8	2013	David Roddy	WGPSN
Romny	25.6°S 18.2°W	5.3	1976	Ukraine place name	WGPSN
Rong	22.7°N 45.4°W	8.8	1988	Tibet place name	WGPSN
Rongxar	26.6°N 55.5°W	22.0	1987	Rongxar, Tibet	WGPSN
Roseau	41.68°S 209.58°W	6.3	2009	Dominica place name	WGPSN
Ross	57.8°S 108.0°W	85.0	1973	Frank Elmore Ross	WGPSN
Rossby	47.9°S 192.2°W	82.5	1973	Carl-Gustaf Rossby	WGPSN
Ruby	25.5°S 17.1°W	27.3	1976	USA (South Carolina) place name	WGPSN
Rudaux	38.3°N 309.1°W	107.0	1973	Lucien Rudaux	WGPSN
Ruhea	43.26°S 173.08°E	9.5	2016	Town in Bangladesh	WGPSN
Runanga	26.63°S 284.14°W	40.4	2006	New Zealand place name	WGPSN
Russell	54.9°S 347.6°W	139.7	1973	Henry Norris Russell	WGPSN
Rutherford	19.2°N 10.7°W	110.5	1973	Ernest Rutherford	WGPSN
Ruza	34.3°S 52.8°W	22.0	1979	Russia place name	WGPSN
Rynok	44.5°N 238.3°W	9.0	1979	Russia place name	WGPSN
Rypin	1.3°S 41.0°W	18.4	1976	Poland place name	WGPSN

back to top

== S ==
Crater	Coordinates	Diameter (km)	Approval date	Named after	Refs
Sabo	25.4°N 49.0°W	4.2	1988	Russia place name	WGPSN
Sagan	10.8°N 30.7°W	98.1	2000	Carl Sagan	WGPSN
Saheki	21.75°S 286.97°W	85.0	2006	Tsuneo Saheki	WGPSN
Salaga	47.5°S 51.1°W	27.1	1976	Salaga, Ghana	WGPSN
Salkhad	29.85°S 83.69°W	42	2018	Salkhad, Syria	WGPSN
San Juan	23.1°N 48.2°W	0.3	1979	San Juan, Puerto Rico	WGPSN
Sandila	25.8°S 30.4°W	13.9	1976	India place name	WGPSN
Sangar	27.8°S 24.4°W	30.9	1976	Russia place name	WGPSN
Santa Cruz	21.5°N 47.3°W	0.9	1979	Santa Cruz de Tenerife, Canary Islands	WGPSN
Santa Fe	19.5°N 48.0°W	20.5	1976	Santa Fe, New Mexico, USA	WGPSN
Santaca	41.4°S 272.7°W	16.0	1991	Mozambique place name	WGPSN
Santa Maria	2.172°S 5.445°W	16.0	(informal)	Santa Maria, ship used by Columbus to cross the Atlantic in 1492.	—
Saravan	16.96°S 54.0°W	47.8	2009	Laos place name	WGPSN
Sarh	65.1°S 14.57°W	54.0	2009	Chad place name	WGPSN
Sarn	77.5°S 54.7°W	11.9	1991	Wales place name	WGPSN
Sarno	44.7°S 54.2°W	23.2	1976	Italy place name	WGPSN
Satka	43.0°S 37.0°W	18.7	1976	Russia place name	WGPSN
Sauk	45.0°S 32.6°W	3.1	1976	USA (Wisconsin) place name	WGPSN
Savannah	22.2°N 47.9°W	0.7	1979	Savannah, Georgia, USA	WGPSN
Savich	27.8°S 264.0°W	188.3	1991	A. M. Savich	WGPSN
Say	28.4°S 29.7°W	13.3	1976	Niger place name	WGPSN
Schaeberle	24.7°S 309.9°W	160.0	1973	John Martin Schaeberle	WGPSN
Schiaparelli	2.7°S 343.3°W	471.0	1973	Giovanni Schiaparelli	WGPSN
Schmidt	72.3°S 78.1°W	212.5	1973	J. F. Julius Schmidt and Otto Schmidt	WGPSN
Schöner	20.1°N 309.5°W	195.0	1976	Johannes Schöner	WGPSN
Schroeter	1.9°S 304.4°W	292.0	1973	Johann Hieronymus Schröter	WGPSN
Sebec	39.9°S 260.7°W	64.0	1991	USA (Maine) place name	WGPSN
Secchi	58.3°S 258.1°W	234.0	1973	Angelo Secchi	WGPSN
Secunda	42.55°N 308.86°W	11.0	2026	Town in South Africa	WGPSN
Sedona	17.84°N 77.54°W	7.4	2020	Sedona, Arizona	WGPSN
Sefadu	28.73°N 35.04°W	10.8	2006	Sierra Leone place name	WGPSN
Selevac	37.7°S 131.1°W	7.3	2016	Serbia place name	WGPSN
Semeykin	41.8°N 351.4°W	76.0	1982	Boris Semeykin	WGPSN
Seminole	24.4°S 19.2°W	20.6	1976	USA (Florida) place name	WGPSN
Sera	8.84°N 358.95°W	28	2018	Sera, Hiroshima, Japan	WGPSN
Sevel	79.3°N 36.8°W	2.0	1988	Denmark place name	WGPSN
Sevi	19.1°N 257.0°W	3.2	1988	Russia place name	WGPSN
Sfax	7.8°S 43.5°W	7.0	1976	Tunisia place name	WGPSN
Shambe	20.8°S 30.8°W	34.2	1976	Sudan place name	WGPSN
Shardi	10.06°N 15.38°W	18.0	2006	Pakistan place name	WGPSN
Sharonov	27.3°N 58.6°W	102.0	1973	Vsevolod Sharonov	WGPSN
Shatskiy	32.7°S 14.9°W	72.5	1979	Nikolay Shatsky	WGPSN
Shawnee	22.7°N 31.6°W	17.0	1976	USA (Ohio) place name	WGPSN
Sian	20.2°N 48.1°W	3.8	1988	Russia place name	WGPSN
Sibiti	12.37°S 294.74°E	33	2017	Town in the Republic of Congo (Congo-Brazzaville)	WGPSN
Sibu	23.3°S 19.8°W	18.2	1976	Sibu, Malaysia	WGPSN
Sidhi	49.69°S 24.41°W	48.0	2025	Sidhi, Madhya Pradesh, India	WGPSN
Sigli	20.5°S 30.9°W	31.4	1976	Indonesia place name	WGPSN
Sinda	15.9°N 248.8°W	6.6	1988	Russia place name	WGPSN
Singa	22.7°S 17.4°W	12.8	1976	Sudan place name	WGPSN
Sinop	23.5°S 249.5°W	15.4	1991	Sinop, Turkey	WGPSN
Sinton	40.72°N 328.35°W	65.25	2007	William M. Sinton	WGPSN
Sitka	4.4°S 39.3°W	17.5	1976	Sitka, Alaska, USA	WGPSN
Sklodowska	33.7°N 2.9°W	124.0	1973	Maria Sklodowska-Curie	WGPSN
Slipher	47.8°S 84.6°W	127.0	1973	Vesto Slipher	WGPSN
Smith	66.1°S 102.9°W	75.5	1973	William Smith	WGPSN
Soffen	21.74°N 55.23°W	30.0	1976	Gerald Soffen	WGPSN
Sögel	23.7°S 219.2°W	60.1	2006	Germany place name	WGPSN
Sokol	42.7°S 40.7°W	22.4	1976	Russia place name	WGPSN
Solano	27.0°S 251.2°W	8.7	1991	Philippines place name	WGPSN
Somerset	9.7°S 51.3°W	3.3	2006	USA (Pennsylvania) place name	WGPSN
Soochow	16.9°N 28.9°W	31.8	1976	China place name	WGPSN
Souris	19.7°N 246.8°W	2.8	1988	Canada (Manitoba) place name	WGPSN
South	77.1°S 338.0°W	107.1	1973	Sir James South	WGPSN
Spallanzani	58.3°S 273.7°W	72.5	1973	Lazzaro Spallanzani	WGPSN
Spry	3.8°S 38.5°W	7.8	1976	USA (Utah) place name	WGPSN
Spur	22.2°N 52.3°W	8.4	1976	USA (Texas) place name	WGPSN
Srīpur	31.1°S 100.8°W	23.4	1991	Bangladesh place name	WGPSN
Stege	3.8°N 59.6°W	77.5	1985	Denmark place name	WGPSN
Steinheim	54.51°N 169.43°W	11.6	2007	Steinheim am Albuch, Germany	WGPSN
Steno	68.0°S 115.6°W	106.9	1973	Nicolas Steno	WGPSN
Stobs	5.0°S 38.4°W	12.5	1976	Scotland place name	WGPSN
Stokes	55.9°N 188.8°W	66.0	1973	George Stokes	WGPSN
Ston	47.2°N 237.4°W	6.9	1979	Croatia place name	WGPSN
Stoney	69.8°S 138.6°W	171.0	1973	George Johnstone Stoney	WGPSN
Suata	19.1°S 253.4°W	24.3	1991	Venezuela place name	WGPSN
Sucre	23.9°N 54.7°W	13.4	1976	Colombia place name	WGPSN
Suess	67.1°S 178.6°W	79.2	1973	Eduard Suess	WGPSN
Sūf	16.5°N 38.3°W	9.9	1976	Jordan place name	WGPSN
Sulak	18.3°N 78.7°W	25.7	1985	Russia place name	WGPSN
Sumgin	37.0°S 48.8°W	85.0	1979	Mikhail Ivanovich Sumgin	WGPSN
Surt	17.0°N 30.7°W	9.9	1976	Libya place name	WGPSN
Suzhi	27.7°S 274.0°W	25.0	1991	China place name	WGPSN
Swanage	26.7°N 33.8°W	18.7	1997	Swanage, England	WGPSN
Sytinskaya	42.7°N 53.1°W	93.2	1982	Nadezhda Nikolaevna Sytinskaya	WGPSN

back to top

== T ==
Crater	Coordinates	Diameter (km)	Approval date	Named after	Refs
Tábor	35.8°S 58.4°W	19.5	1979	Czech Republic place name	WGPSN
Tabou	45.4°S 35.1°W	8.3	1976	Ivory Coast place name	WGPSN
Taejin	35.5°S 274.4°W	28.0	1991	South Korea place name	WGPSN
Tak	26.3°S 28.7°W	5.1	1976	Tak Province, Thailand	WGPSN
Tala	20.5°S 247.3°W	9.0	1991	Tunisia place name	WGPSN
Talas	36.0°S 284.6°W	30.0	2015	Kyrgyzstan place name	WGPSN
Talsi	41.9°S 49.4°W	10.0	1976	Latvia place name	WGPSN
Taltal	39.51°S 234.21°E	10	2016	Town in Chile	WGPSN
Talu	40.7°S 339.9°W	10.0	2016	Indonesia place name	WGPSN
Tame	23.0°S 108.1°W	13.5	1991	Colombia place name	WGPSN
Tara	44.4°S 52.9°W	34.0	1976	Ireland place name	WGPSN
Tarakan	41.5°S 30.5°W	39.8	1976	Indonesia place name	WGPSN
Tarata	3.8°S 41.3°W	12.3	1976	Bolivia place name	WGPSN
Tarma	16.7°N 250.2°W	8.9	1988	Peru place name	WGPSN
Tarq	38.1°N 171.22°E	35.36	2017	Town in Iran	WGPSN
Tarsus	23.3°N 40.3°W	19.0	1976	Tarsus, Mersin, Turkey	WGPSN
Tavua	15.62°N 242.48°W	32.3	2008	Fiji place name	WGPSN
Taxco	20.9°N 40.2°W	17.5	1976	Mexico place name	WGPSN
Taytay	7.37°N 19.65°W	18.4	2006	Taytay, Philippines	WGPSN
Taza	43.9°S 45.3°W	24.0	1976	Morocco place name	WGPSN
Tecolote	24.8°S 106.9°W	51.0	1991	USA (New Mexico) place name	WGPSN
Tehachapi	36.57°N 329.58°W	26	2019	Tehachapi, California	WGPSN
Teisserenc de Bort	0.4°N 315.0°W	119.0	1973	Léon Teisserenc de Bort	WGPSN
Tejn	15.6°N 253.6°W	3.6	1988	Denmark place name	WGPSN
Telz	21.4°N 248.9°W	2.6	1988	Germany place name	WGPSN
Temʼ	42.3°N 9.5°W	5.9	1976	Russia place name	WGPSN
Tepko	15.4°N 256.6°W	3.8	1988	South Australia place name	WGPSN
Terby	28.3°S 285.9°W	174.0	1973	François J. Terby	WGPSN
Thermia	19.9°N 250.9°W	2.9	1988	Greece place name	WGPSN
Thila	18.09°N 204.58°W	5.3	2008	Thula, Yemen	WGPSN
Thira	14.6°S 184.1°W	22.5	1997	Fira, Greece	WGPSN
Thom	41.4°S 267.8°W	24.0	1991	Thailand place name. Na Thom District, Nakhon Phanom.	WGPSN
Thule	23.6°S 25.8°W	13.3	1976	Greenland place name	WGPSN
Tibrikot	12.6°N 55.0°W	61.9	1988	Nepal place name	WGPSN
Tignish	31.0°S 273.1°W	22.0	1991	Canada (Prince Edward Island) place name	WGPSN
Tikhonravov	13.5°N 324.2°W	386.0	1985	Mikhail Tikhonravov	WGPSN
Tikhov	51.1°S 254.3°W	111.0	1973	Gavriil Adrianovich Tikhov	WGPSN
Tile	17.9°N 28.7°W	7.4	1976	Somalia place name	WGPSN
Timaru	25.5°S 22.4°W	17.9	1976	New Zealand place name	WGPSN
Timbuktu	5.7°S 37.6°W	73.0	1976	Timbuktu, Mali	WGPSN
Timoshenko	42.0°N 64.1°W	88.5	1982	Ivan Fedorovich Timoshenko	WGPSN
Tivat	46.3°S 250.5°W	3.6	2011	Montenegro place name	WGPSN
Tivoli	14.3°S 259.18°W	32.4	2010	Grenada place name	WGPSN
Tiwi	27.8°S 24.8°W	21.4	1976	Oman place name	WGPSN
Toconao	20.9°S 74.8°W	17.7	2006	Chile place name	WGPSN
Tokko	22.8°N 250.6°W	2.1	1988	Russia place name	WGPSN
Tokma	21.5°N 251.5°W	3.2	1988	Russia place name	WGPSN
Tokmok	29.38°S 351.34°W	9.5	2025	Town in Kyrgyzstan	WGPSN
Tolon	18.4°N 255.1°W	2.7	1988	Russia place name	WGPSN
Tomari	20.2°N 246.3°W	5.9	1988	Russia place name	WGPSN
Tombaugh	3.5°N 198.2°W	60.3	2006	Clyde Tombaugh; American astronomer (1906–1997)	WGPSN
Tombe	42.8°S 44.5°W	11.6	1976	Sudan place name	WGPSN
Tomini	16.27°N 234.2°W	7.4	2006	Indonesia place name	WGPSN
Tooting	23.1°N 152.4°W	27.5	2006	Tooting, England	WGPSN
Topola	15.83°N 267.79°W	8	2018	Topola, Serbia	WGPSN
Torbay	18.1°N 246.0°W	6.5	1988	Western Australia place name	WGPSN
Toro	17.04°N 71.82°E	41.4	2008	Spain place name	WGPSN
Torso	44.6°S 51.2°W	16.0	1976	Torsö, Sweden	WGPSN
Torup	28.2°S 262.3°W	45.5	1991	Sweden place name	WGPSN
Townsend	51.88°S 21.033°W	92.0	2025	Marjorie Townsend	WGPSN
Trinidad	23.6°S 251.0°W	28.0	1991	Peru place name	WGPSN
Triolet	37.09°S 168.14°W	11.66	2008	Mauritius place name	WGPSN
Troika	17.0°N 254.9°W	13.5	1976	Sweden place name	WGPSN
Trouvelot	16.2°N 13.1°W	154.7	1973	Étienne Léopold Trouvelot	WGPSN
Troy	23.4°N 52.7°W	9.9	1976	USA (Idaho) place name	WGPSN
Trud	17.9°N 31.7°W	2.1	1976	Russia place name	WGPSN
Trumpler	61.8°S 150.8°W	78.0	1973	Robert Julius Trumpler	WGPSN
Tsau	49.8°N 239.0°W	6.5	1979	Botswana	WGPSN
Tsukuba	48.9°N 226.1°W	1.8	1979	Tsukuba, Japan	WGPSN
Tuapi	17.2°N 255.7°W	4.6	1988	Nicaragua place name	WGPSN
Tugaske	32.1°S 101.2°W	31.3	1991	Tugaske, Canada	WGPSN
Tumul	14.9°N 255.5°W	8.8	1988	Russia place name	WGPSN
Tungla	41.1°S 270.5°W	17.0	1991	Nicaragua place name	WGPSN
Tupã	42.68°S 38.09°W	45.0	2025	Town in São Paulo, Brazil	WGPSN
Tura	26.9°S 22.0°W	16.4	1976	Russia place name	WGPSN
Turbi	41.0°S 51.5°W	31.3	1976	Kenya place name	WGPSN
Turma	17.5°N 252.0°W	6.8	1988	Russia place name	WGPSN
Tuscaloosa	0.0°N 331.3°W	60.0	2000	USA (Alabama) place name	WGPSN
Tuskegee	2.9°S 36.2°W	66.7	1976	USA (Alabama) place name	WGPSN
Tycho Brahe	49.8°S 213.9°W	106.0	1973	Tycho Brahe	WGPSN
Tyndall	40.0°N 190.1°W	86.8	1973	John Tyndall	WGPSN
Tyuratam	45.0°S 202.0°W	0.3	2013	Töretam, Kazakhstan	WGPSN

back to top

== U ==
Crater	Coordinates	Diameter (km)	Approval date	Named after	Refs
Ubud	10.63°S 341.68°E	27	2016	Town in Indonesia	WGPSN
Udzha	81.98°N 282.8°W	45.0	2006	Russia place name	WGPSN
Ulricehamn	17.95°N 76.91°W	2.34	2020	Ulricehamn, Sweden	WGPSN
Ulu	22.7°N 252.7°W	3.4	1988	Russia place name	WGPSN
Ulya	18.1°S 248.4°W	8.6	1991	Russia place name	WGPSN
Umatac	42.8°N 222.8°W	17.5	1979	Guam place name	WGPSN
Urk	23.4°N 248.6°W	2.8	1988	Urk, Netherlands	WGPSN
Utan	24.5°N 246.3°W	4.6	1988	Russia place name	WGPSN
Uzer	1.2°S 1.76°W	8.8	2006	France place name	WGPSN

back to top

== V ==
Crater	Coordinates	Diameter (km)	Approval date	Named after	Refs
Vaals	4.0°S 33.0°W	10.6	1976	Netherlands place name	WGPSN
Vaduz	38.25°N 344.29°W	1.9	2010	Vaduz, Liechtenstein	WGPSN
Valga	44.7°S 36.7°W	17.0	1976	Estonia place name	WGPSN
Valverde	20.3°N 55.8°W	36.3	1976	Dominican Republic place name	WGPSN
Vätö	44.0°S 53.7°W	20.0	1976	Sweden place name	WGPSN
Vaux	18.1°N 32.9°W	6.3	1976	France place name	WGPSN
Verlaine	9.3°S 296.0°W	43.0	1994	France place name	WGPSN
Vernal	5.88°N 4.5°W	57.0	2006	Vernal, Utah, USA	WGPSN
Very	49.6°S 177.1°W	114.0	1973	Frank Washington Very	WGPSN
Viana	19.4°N 255.3°W	30.0	1976	Brazil place name	WGPSN
Victoria	2.05°S 5.5°W	0.8	2008	Victoria, Seychelles	WGPSN
Vik	36.4°S 64.0°W	23.0	1979	Iceland place name	WGPSN
Vils	39.4°N 11.8°W	6.9	1976	Austria place name	WGPSN
Vinogradov	20.2°S 37.7°W	223.5	1979	Alexander Pavlovich Vinogradov	WGPSN
Vinogradsky	56.5°S 216.2°W	64.0	1973	Sergei Winogradsky	WGPSN
Virrat	31.1°S 103.0°W	53.6	1991	Virrat, Finland	WGPSN
Vishniac	76.7°S 276.1°W	86.1	1976	Wolf V. Vishniac	WGPSN
Vivero	49.3°N 241.2°W	27.5	1979	Spain place name	WGPSN
Voeykov	32.4°S 76.2°W	76.0	1979	Alexander Voeikov	WGPSN
Vogel	37.1°S 13.4°W	121.0	1973	Hermann Carl Vogel	WGPSN
Volgograd	23.2°N 51.3°W	8.4	1976	Volgograd, Russia	WGPSN
Volʼsk	48.4°N 224.9°W	1.6	1979	Volsk, Russia	WGPSN
Von Kármán	64.6°S 58.5°W	90.0	1973	Theodore von Kármán	WGPSN
Voo	27.2°S 20.0°W	1.5	1976	Kenya place name	WGPSN
Voza	23.6°N 53.6°W	2.6	1988	Solomon Islands place name	WGPSN

back to top

== W ==
Crater	Coordinates	Diameter (km)	Approval date	Named after	Refs
Wabash	21.6°N 33.7°W	42.0	1976	USA (Indiana) place name	WGPSN
Wafra	4.3°N 148.5°W	30.2	2013	Kuwait place name	WGPSN
Wahoo	23.5°N 33.8°W	67.2	1976	USA (Nebraska) place name	WGPSN
Wajir	27.3°S 254.6°W	12.0	1991	Kenya place name	WGPSN
Wallace	52.9°S 249.4°W	173.0	1973	Alfred Russel Wallace	WGPSN
Wallops	46.9°N 227.3°W	2.0	1979	Wallops Flight Facility, Virginia, USA	WGPSN
Wallula	9.9°S 54.4°W	12.5	2006	USA (Washington) place name	WGPSN
Warra	21.0°N 37.7°W	10.3	1976	Australia (Queensland) place name	WGPSN
Waspam	20.6°N 56.7°W	41.8	1976	Nicaragua place name	WGPSN
Wassamu	25.8°N 53.3°W	17.5	1976	Japan place name	WGPSN
Wau	45.2°S 42.7°W	6.0	1976	Papua New Guinea place name	WGPSN
Weert	19.9°N 51.8°W	10.0	1976	Netherlands place name	WGPSN
Wegener	64.6°S 4.0°W	76.8	1973	Alfred Wegener	WGPSN
Weinbaum	65.7°S 245.5°W	89.4	1973	Stanley G. Weinbaum	WGPSN
Wells	60.2°S 237.9°W	103.0	1973	H. G. Wells	WGPSN
Wer	46.0°N 6.2°W	3.1	1976	India place name	WGPSN
Wicklow	2.0°S 40.6°W	22.4	1976	Ireland place name	WGPSN
Wien	10.8°S 220.4°W	120.4	1976	Wilhelm Wien	WGPSN
Williams	18.7°S 164.3°W	126.0	1973	Arthur S. Williams	WGPSN
Wilmington	21.8°N 47.5°W	0.5	1979	Wilmington, Delaware, USA	WGPSN
Wiltz	15.51°N 200.91°W	1.2	2008	Luxembourg place name	WGPSN
Windfall	2.1°S 43.4°W	17.9	1976	Canada (Alberta) place name	WGPSN
Wink	6.6°S 41.4°W	10.5	1976	USA (Texas) place name	WGPSN
Winslow	3.8°S 300.8°W	1.0	2006	Winslow, Arizona, USA	WGPSN
Wirtz	48.6°S 26.0°W	129.0	1973	Carl Wilhelm Wirtz	WGPSN
Wislicenus	18.4°S 348.6°W	139.0	1973	Walter Wislicenus	WGPSN
Woking	5.14°N 277.08°W	9.8	2006	Woking, England	WGPSN
Woolgar	34.9°N 85.6°W	15.5	1991	Australia (Queensland) place name	WGPSN
Woomera	48.4°N 227.4°W	2.5	1979	Woomera, South Australia	WGPSN
Worcester	26.9°N 50.5°W	24.0	1988	Worcester, New York, USA	WGPSN
Wright	58.9°S 151.0°W	115.0	1973	William Hammond Wright	WGPSN
Wukari	32.1°S 102.9°W	38.4	1991	Nigeria place name	WGPSN
Wulai	10.24°N 0.99°W	50.5	2018	Wulai District, Taiwan	WGPSN
Wynn-Williams	55.11°S 299.87°W	67.2	2006	David D. Wynn-Williams	WGPSN

back to top

== X ==
Crater	Coordinates	Diameter (km)	Approval date	Named after	Refs
Xainza	0.78°N 3.96°W	24.6	2006	China place name	WGPSN
Xui	15.3°N 247.4°W	2.7	1988	Brazil place name	WGPSN

back to top

== Y ==
Crater	Coordinates	Diameter (km)	Approval date	Named after	Refs
Yakima	43.4°N 3.2°W	13.0	1976	USA (Washington) place name	WGPSN
Yala	17.6°N 38.7°W	19.8	1976	Yala Province, Thailand	WGPSN
Yalata	22.0°N 253.9°W	4.8	1988	South Australia place name	WGPSN
Yalgoo	4.94°N 275.85°W	17.9	2006	Western Australia place name	WGPSN
Yar	22.5°N 39.2°W	6.4	1976	Russia place name	WGPSN
Yaren	43.91°S 137.57°W	9.6	2009	Nauru place name	WGPSN
Yat	18.3°N 29.1°W	7.6	1976	Niger place name	WGPSN
Yebra	21.0°N 254.4°W	4.4	1988	Spain place name	WGPSN
Yegros	22.5°S 23.7°W	14.5	1976	Paraguay place name	WGPSN
Yelapa	3.83°N 1.13°W	29	2018	Yelapa, Mexico	WGPSN
Yelwa	31.2°N 122.7°W	8.5	2018	Nigeria place name	WGPSN
Yorktown	23.1°N 48.7°W	8.1	1976	Yorktown, Virginia, USA	WGPSN
Yoro	23.0°N 28.1°W	9.8	1976	Honduras place name	WGPSN
Yungay	44.2°S 44.8°W	21.0	1976	Peru place name	WGPSN
Yuty	22.4°N 34.2°W	19.9	1976	Yuty, Paraguay	WGPSN

back to top

== Z ==
Crater	Coordinates	Diameter (km)	Approval date	Named after	Refs
Zaim	18.08°N 336.97°E	24	2020	Zaim, Căușeni, Moldova	WGPSN
Zarand	3.39°S 1.5°W	2.2	2006	Iran place name	WGPSN
Zaranj	12.1°N 247.02°W	28.0	2008	Afghanistan place name	WGPSN
Zhigou	29.4°S 102.7°W	22.0	1991	China place name	WGPSN
Zilair	32.1°S 33.0°W	48.0	1979	Zilair, Russia	WGPSN
Zir	18.7°N 36.6°W	6.2	1976	Zir,Osmaniye,Sincan, Ankara, Turkey	WGPSN
Zongo	34.1°S 41.8°W	46.9	1979	Zongo, Sud-Ubangi, Dem. Rep. Congo	WGPSN
Žulanka	2.3°S 42.3°W	47.1	1976	Russia place name	WGPSN
Zumba	28.68°S 133.18°W	3.3	2006	Ecuador place name	WGPSN
Zuni	19.4°N 29.6°W	25.1	1976	USA (New Mexico) place name	WGPSN
Zunil	7.8°N 193.9°W	10.4	2003	Zunil, Guatemala	WGPSN
Zutphen	14.0°S 185.8°W	38.0	2003	Netherlands place name	WGPSN

back to top

== See also ==
- List of catenae on Mars
- List of craters on Mars
- List of mountains on Mars
