= Spallanzani (disambiguation) =

Spallanzani may refer to:

- Lazzaro Spallanzani (1729-1799), an Italian Catholic priest, biologist and physiologist; and things named for him:
  - Lazzaro Spallanzani National Institute for Infectious Diseases
  - Spallanzani (lunar crater)
  - Spallanzani (Martian crater)
  - Spallanzani Point, Antarctica
  - 10350 Spallanzani, a main belt asteroid
- Marco Spallanzani, a teacher of economic history at the University of Florence
