= Penticton (crater) =

- Planet: Mars
- Region: Hellas quadrangle
- Coordinates: 38.35°S 263.35°W
- Quadrangle: Hellas
- Diameter: 8 kilometres (5 mi)
- Eponym: Penticton

Penticton is an impact crater in the Hellas quadrangle of Mars, located at 38.35° south latitude and 263.35° west longitude. Penticton is on the eastern rim of the Hellas impact crater. It is 8 kilometers in diameter and was named after Penticton, a city in British Columbia, Canada, nearby the little town of Okanagan Falls where is located the Dominion Radio Astrophysical Observatory. Images with HiRISE show gullies which were once thought to be caused by flowing water.

== Description ==
Penticton is famous with Mars geologists because evidence for recent flowing liquid was found there. The Mars Reconnaissance Orbiter discovered changes on the wall of Penticton Crater between 1999 and 2004. One interpretation of the changes was that they were caused by water flowing on the surface. A further analysis, published about a year later, revealed that the deposit could have been caused by gravity moving material downslope. The slope where the deposit was sighted was close to the stability limits of dry, unconsolidated materials.

Martian gullies are small, incised networks of narrow channels and their associated downslope sediment deposits, found on the planet of Mars. They are named for their resemblance to terrestrial gullies. First discovered on images from Mars Global Surveyor, they occur on steep slopes, especially on the walls of craters. Usually, each gully has a dendritic alcove at its head, a fan-shaped apron at its base, and a single thread of incised channel linking the two, giving the whole gully an hourglass shape. They are believed to be relatively young because they have few, if any craters. A subclass of gullies is also found cut into the faces of sand dunes which themselves considered to be quite young. On the basis of their form, aspects, positions, location and apparent interaction with features thought to be rich in water ice, many researchers believed that the processes carving the gullies involve liquid water. However, this remains a topic of active research.

As soon as gullies were discovered, researchers began to image many gullies over and over, looking for possible changes. By 2006, some changes were found. Later, with further analysis it was determined that the changes could have occurred by dry granular flows rather than being driven by flowing water. With continued observations many more changes were found in Gasa Crater and others.

With more repeated observations, more and more changes have been found; since the changes occur in the winter and spring, experts are tending to believe that gullies were formed from dry ice. Before-and-after images demonstrated the timing of this activity coincided with seasonal carbon-dioxide frost and temperatures that would not have allowed for liquid water. When dry ice frost changes to a gas, it may lubricate dry material to flow especially on steep slopes. In some years frost, perhaps as thick as 1 meter,

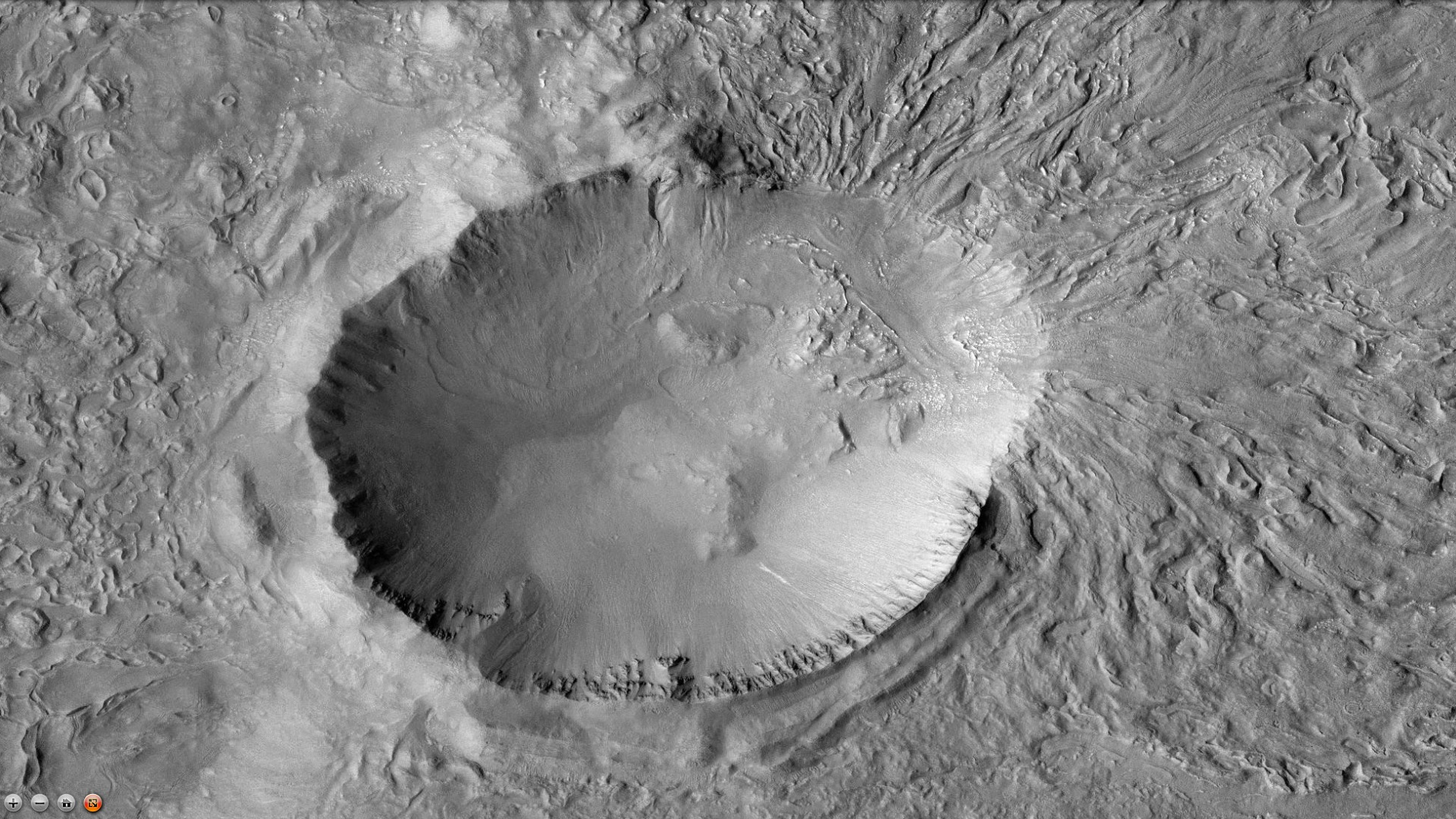
Penticton Crater, as seen by CTX camera (on Mars Reconnaissance Orbiter).

Penticton Crater New Light-Toned Feature, as seen by HiRISE

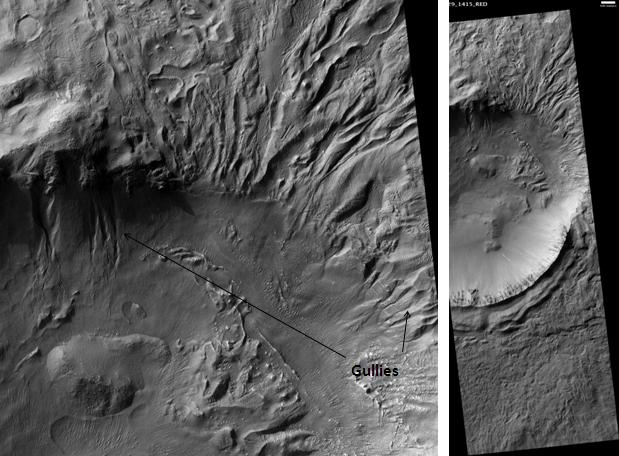
Penticton Crater gullies, as seen by HiRISE

== See also ==
- Climate of Mars
- HiRISE
- Impact crater
- Impact event
- List of craters on Mars
- Martian gullies
- Ore resources on Mars
- Planetary nomenclature
- Water on Mars
