= Puńsk (crater) =

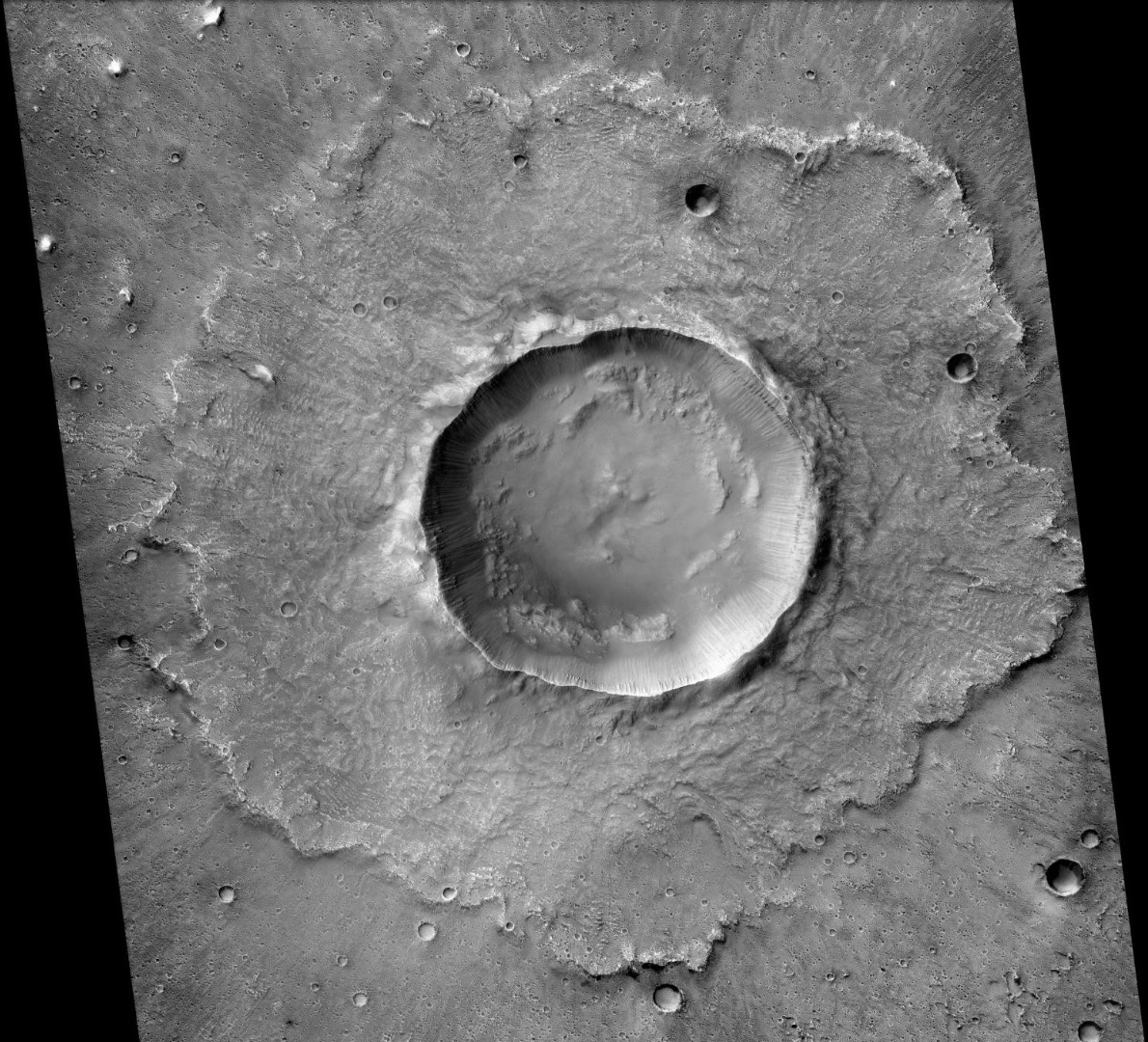
- Puńsk crater, as seen by CTX camera on MRO.
- Planet: Mars
- Coordinates: 20.8°N 41.2°W
- Quadrangle: Oxia Palus
- Diameter: 11.6 km
- Eponym: Puńsk, Poland

Puńsk is an impact crater on Mars, located in the Oxia Palus quadrangle at 20.8° N and 41.2° W. It measures 11.6 kilometers in diameter and was named after the village of Puńsk in Poland.

Impact craters generally have a rim with ejecta around them, in contrast volcanic craters usually do not have a rim or ejecta deposits. As craters get larger (greater than 10 km in diameter) they usually have a central peak. The peak is caused by a rebound of the crater floor following the impact.

Puńsk crater belongs to the class of craters called "Rampart craters" of the single-ejecta variety. Single-layered ejecta craters are one type of rampart crater. They have one ejecta lobe that extends 1 to 1.5 crater radii from the rim of the crater. They have an average diameter of 10 km. Although present at all latitudes, they are most common near the equator. Their average size increases the more distant from the equator. It has been suggested that these types of craters are produced by impact into icy ground. Specifically, it is an impact that does not go entirely through the icy layer. The increase in size away from the equator is explained by a possible greater thickness in the icy layer away from the equator.

Puńsk crater, as seen by HiRISE. Scale bar is 500 meters long. Image on right is an enlargement of south (bottom) wall of crater.

== See also ==
- Impact crater
- Impact event
- List of craters on Mars
- Ore resources on Mars
- Planetary nomenclature
- Rampart crater
- Water on Mars
