= Santa Maria (crater) =

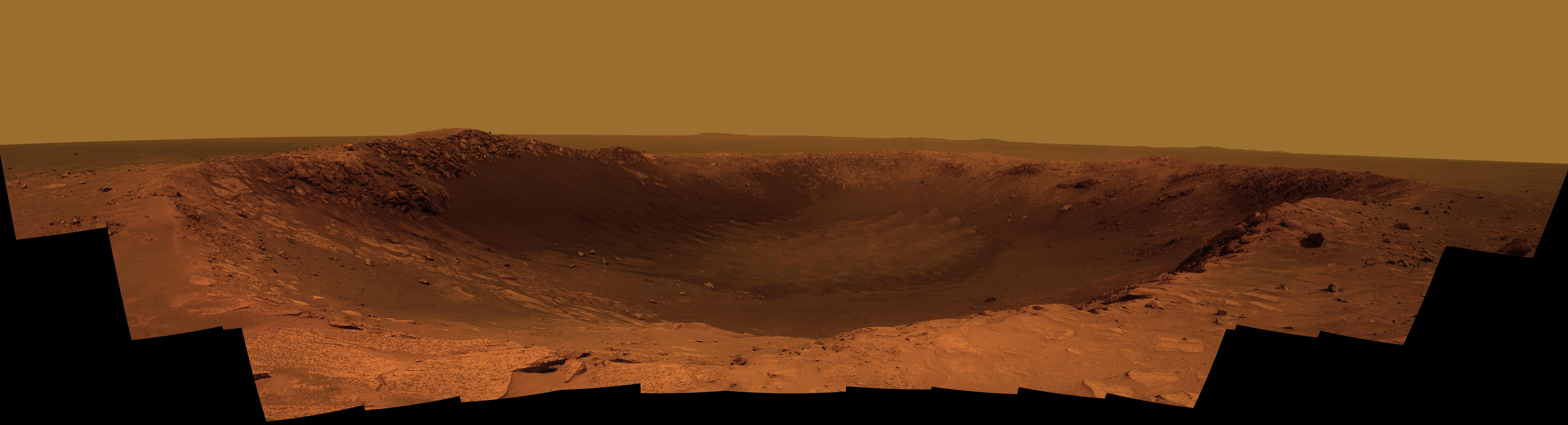
- Panorama taken by Opportunity rover on December 18th, 2010
- Planet: Mars
- Region: Meridiani Planum
- Coordinates: 2.172°S 5.445°W
- Quadrangle: Margaritifer Sinus
- Diameter: 90 meters (295 feet)
- Discoverer: Opportunity rover
- Eponym: Santa Maria, a ship used by Christopher Columbus during his crossing of the Atlantic in 1492.

Santa Maria is an impact crater on Mars, located at 2.172°S, 5.445°W within the Meridiani Planum extraterrestrial plain, lying situated within the Margaritifer Sinus quadrangle (MC-19) region.

This geological feature was first visited by the Mars Exploration Rover Opportunity. It sits north west of the much larger Endeavour crater. The crater measures about 80–90 m (260–300 ft) across. Its name has not been officially recognized by the Working Group for Planetary System Nomenclature.

== Exploration ==
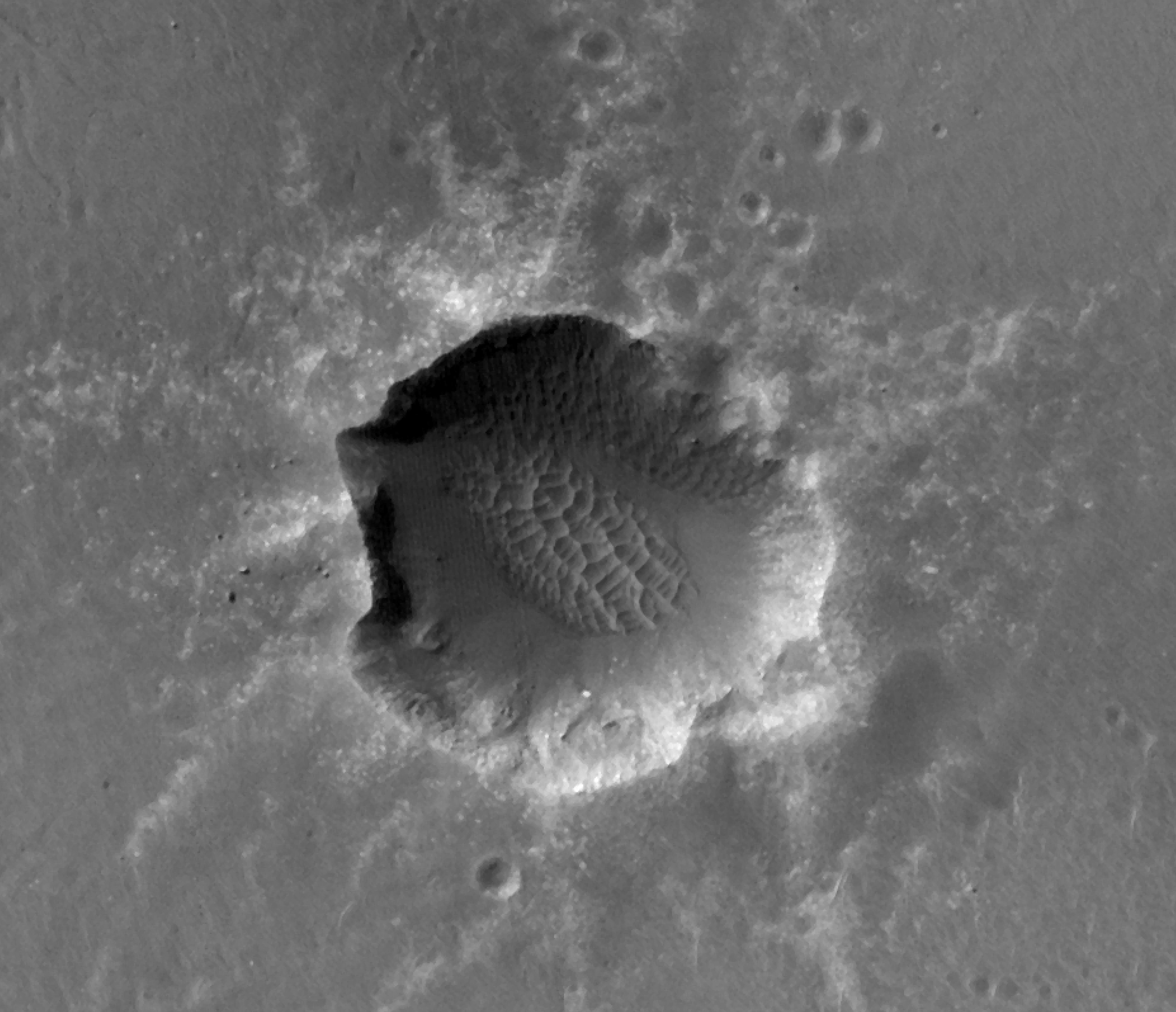
Santa Maria crater from orbit, by HiRise

Opportunity arrived at the crater on December 15, 2010. The rover was positioned at the south eastern rim, where it took several images and prepared for the oncoming Solar Conjunction. The last communication made before the conjunction was on February 3, 2011. Communications resumed around a week later, and the rover performed several in-situ studies of the rocks "Luis de Torres" and "Ruiz Garcia". The rover left the crater on March 22, heading eastwards towards Endeavour crater.

== See also ==
- Geography of Mars
- List of craters on Mars
