= Ritchey (Martian crater) =

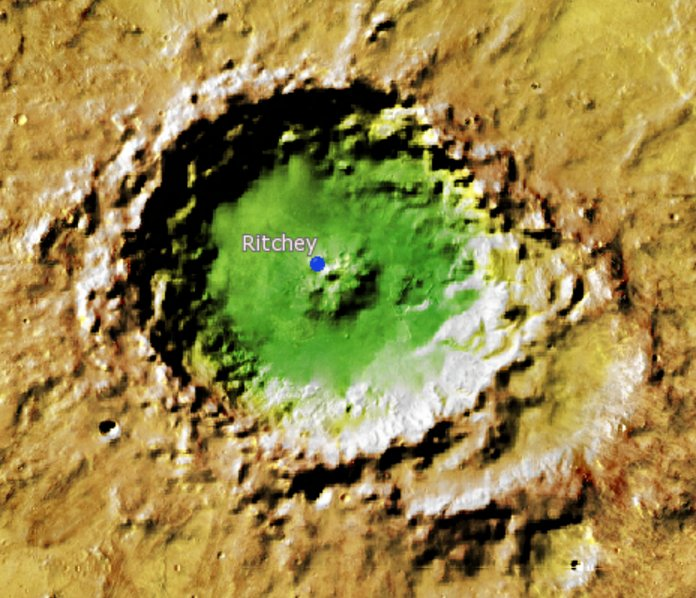
- Topographic map of Ritchey crater
- Planet: Mars
- Region: Coprates quadrangle
- Coordinates: 28.8°S 51°W
- Quadrangle: Coprates
- Diameter: 79 km
- Eponym: George W. Ritchey, an American astronomer (1864-1945)

Ritchey is a crater on Mars, located in the Coprates quadrangle at 28.8° South and 51° West. It measures 79 kilometers in diameter and was named after George W. Ritchey, an American astronomer (1864–1945). Ritchey lies south of Valles Marineris and north of Argyre Planitia, a large impact crater. There is strong evidence that it was once a lake.

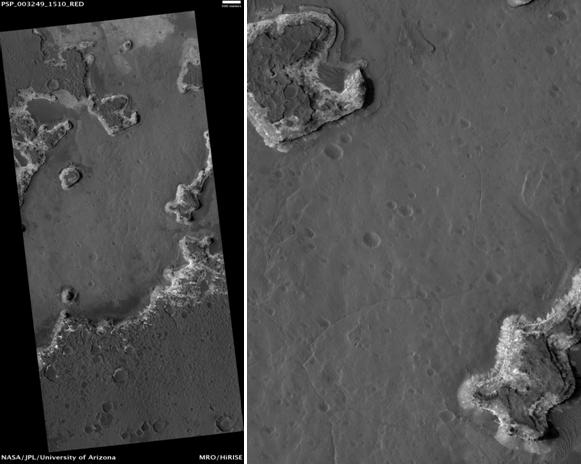
Ritchey Crater layers, as seen by HiRISE. The dark cap layer seems to be resistant to erosion, while the white middle layer is weak. Click on image to see more details. Scale bar is 500 meters long.

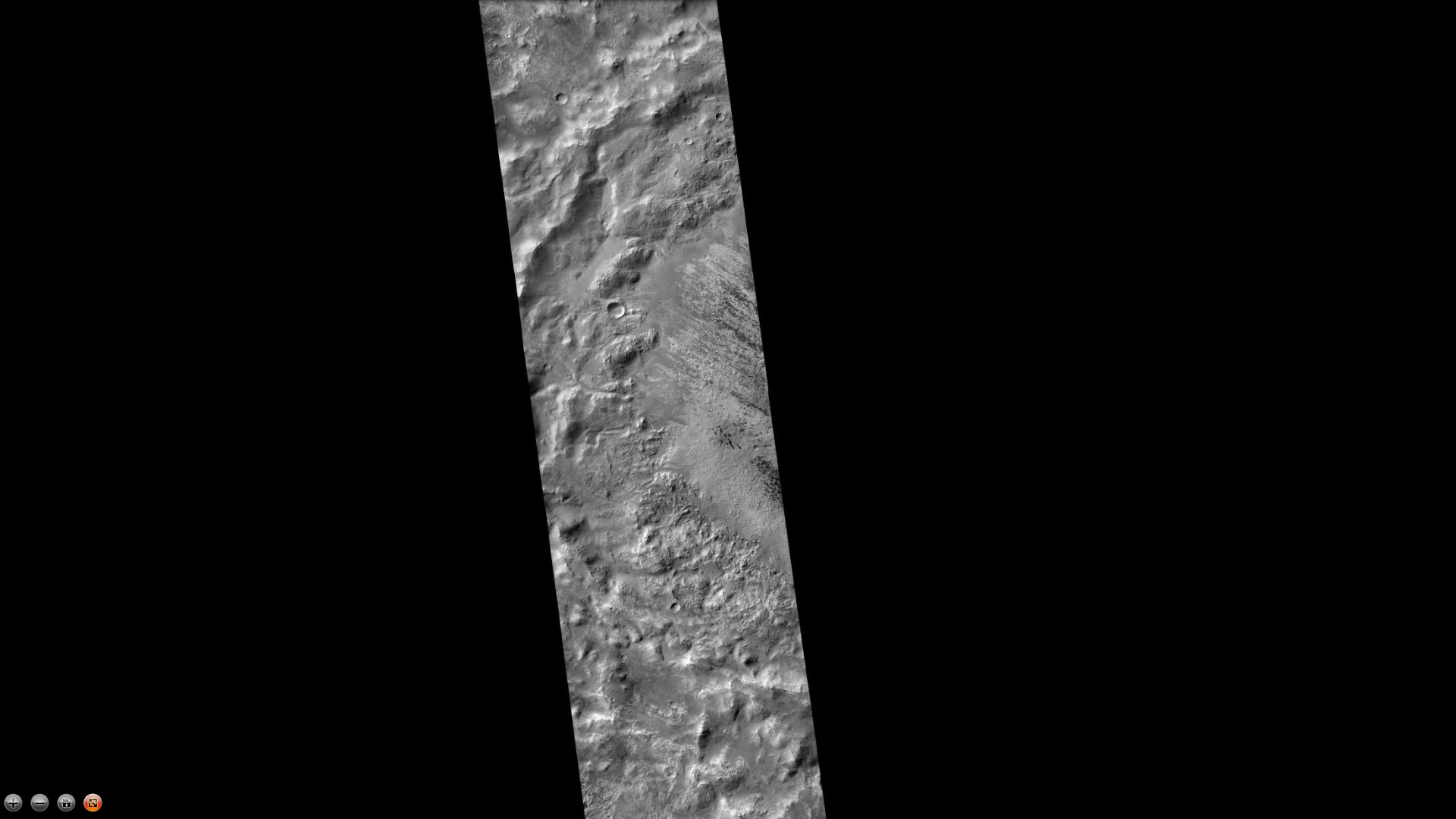
Western side of Ritchey Crater, as seen by CTX camera (on Mars Reconnaissance Orbiter).

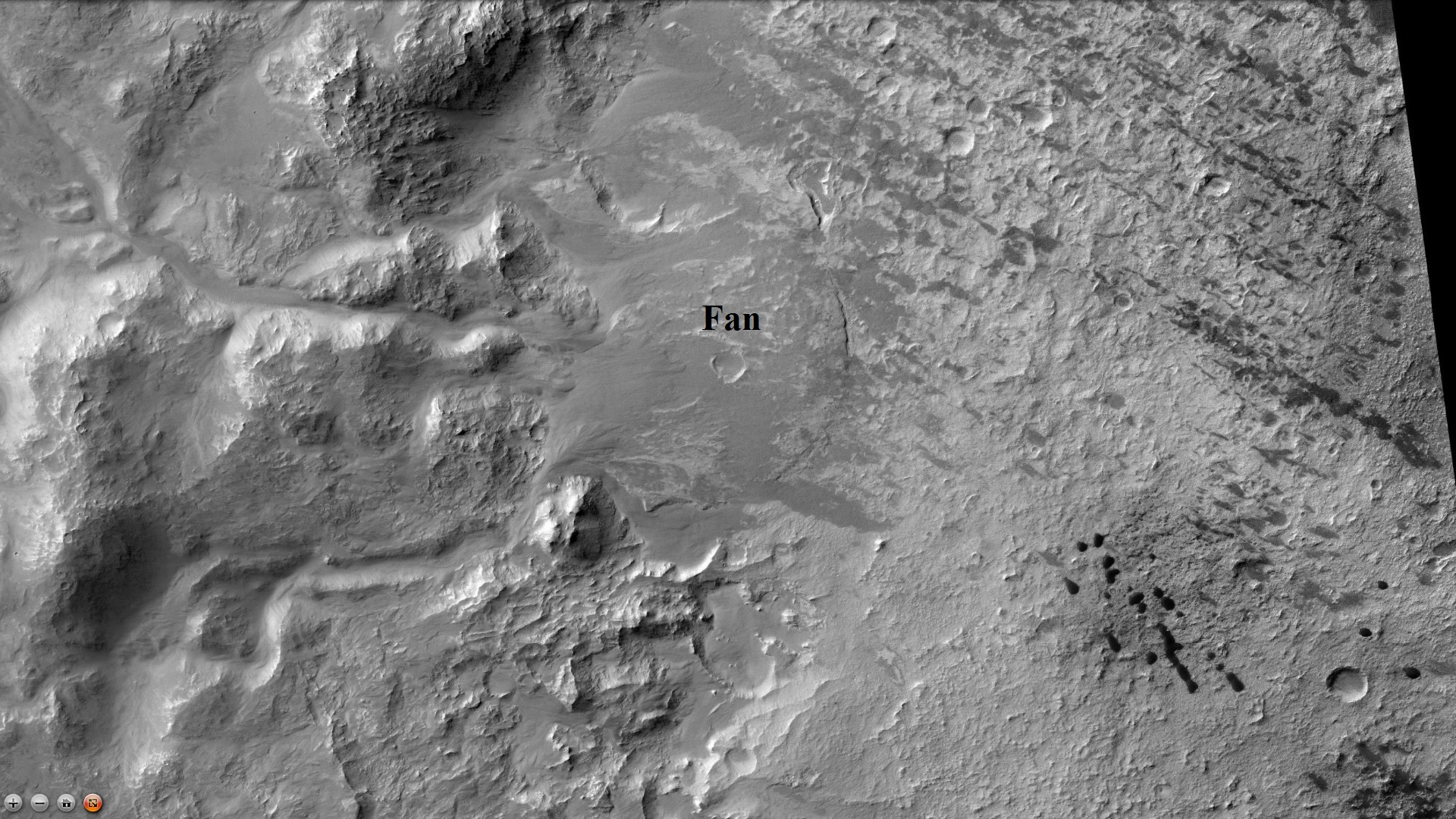
Fan along western wall of Ritchey Crater, as seen by CTX camera (on Mars Reconnaissance Orbiter). Note: this is an enlargement of previous image.

== Description ==
It formed later than the Noachian period. Pictures from HiRISE show that the central peak has massive bedrock and megabreccia with large clasts.

Ritchey Crater is interesting to scientists because it displays several different layers. A dark layer at the top forms a cap rock that protects the underlying layers from erosion. Under this hard, dark layer is a softer, light-toned rock, that breaks into small boulders. The layers might be formed of volcanic ash, lake or stream deposits, or sand dunes. Fluvial channels and fan deposit are common on and along the walls.

Clay minerals have been found in Ritchy. These minerals indicate that water was present for a time. Evidence of smectite clay was found around the central uplift of the crater in a geologic unit that was probably formed as a consequence of the impact. The heat of the impact allowed liquid water to be present long enough to turn minerals into clay. Researchers at Brown University discovered impact melt deposits containing clay minerals in Ritchey Crater. Impact melt forms when rock melted during an impact cools and hardens. Clay minerals found within these deposits probably formed after the impact event.

Because Ritchey is Hesperian or younger in age this means that liquid water could have existed at various times in Martian history. Clay minerals were also found in the crater wall, crater floor, and fan deposits but it is not clear when they might have been produced. These minerals could have formed in place, transported from another location, or have been come from erosion of preexisting clays. However, there is spectral evidence that at least some of the clays in the crater floor and fan deposits came from the crater wall.

Hydrated silica, maybe in the form of hydrated opaline silica has been detected at the central uplift. Also, Olivine, Low calcium pyroxene and plagioclase have recently been detected there, as well.

Ritchey Crater has been suggested as a landing site for a Mars Rover. It may have once held a large lake. A thick sequence of sedimentary deposits that include clay is found in the crater. The presence of fluvial features along crater wall and rim, as well as alluvial/fluvial deposits are strong evidence of abundant water being once present.

== See also ==
- List of craters on Mars
