= Zumba (crater) =

Zumba Crater
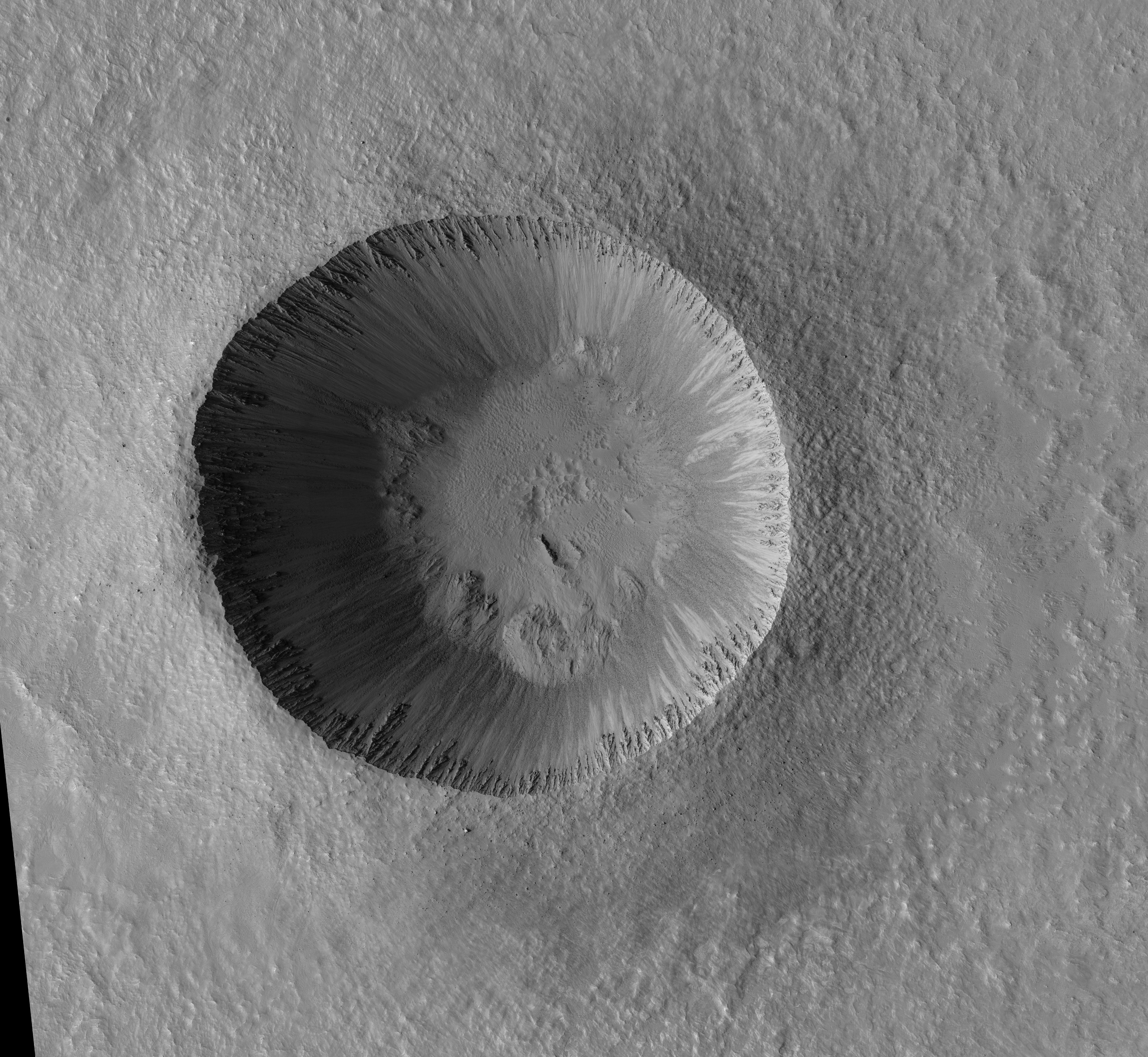
- Zumba Crater, as seen here by HiRISE, is a very young crater.
- Planet: Mars
- Coordinates: 28.68°S 133.18°W
- Quadrangle: Phoenicis Lacus
- Diameter: 2.93 km (1.82 mi)
- Eponym: Zumba, Ecuador

Zumba is a very young crater on Mars, located in the Phoenicis Lacus quadrangle at 28.68 South and 133.18 West. It measures approximately 2.93 kilometres (1.82 mi) in diameter and was named after the town of Zumba in Ecuador. The name was adopted by IAU's Working Group for Planetary System Nomenclature in 2006.

== Description ==
THEMIS day-time image of Zumba

Zumba has a depth of about 620 metres (2,030 ft), and its rim rises about 200 metres (660 ft) above the surrounding lava-filled plains of Daedalia Planum. Zumba is approximately 25% deeper than the average Martian crater of this size, this fact suggests it is a very fresh crater.

Since Zumba is so young, it is a perfect example of a simple crater. On Mars, a simple crater is generally less than 6–9 km (3.7–5.6 mi) in diameter with a conical-bowl shape, little wall collapse, and it lacks a well-developed central feature, like a central peak.

Zumba is of special interest to scientists, because it possesses interesting features that are typically buried or eroded away in other older Martian craters, and even within the freshest terrestrial craters, including Meteor Crater in Arizona. These preserved and newly recognized features observed at the scale of HiRISE may reveal new aspects of the impact process.

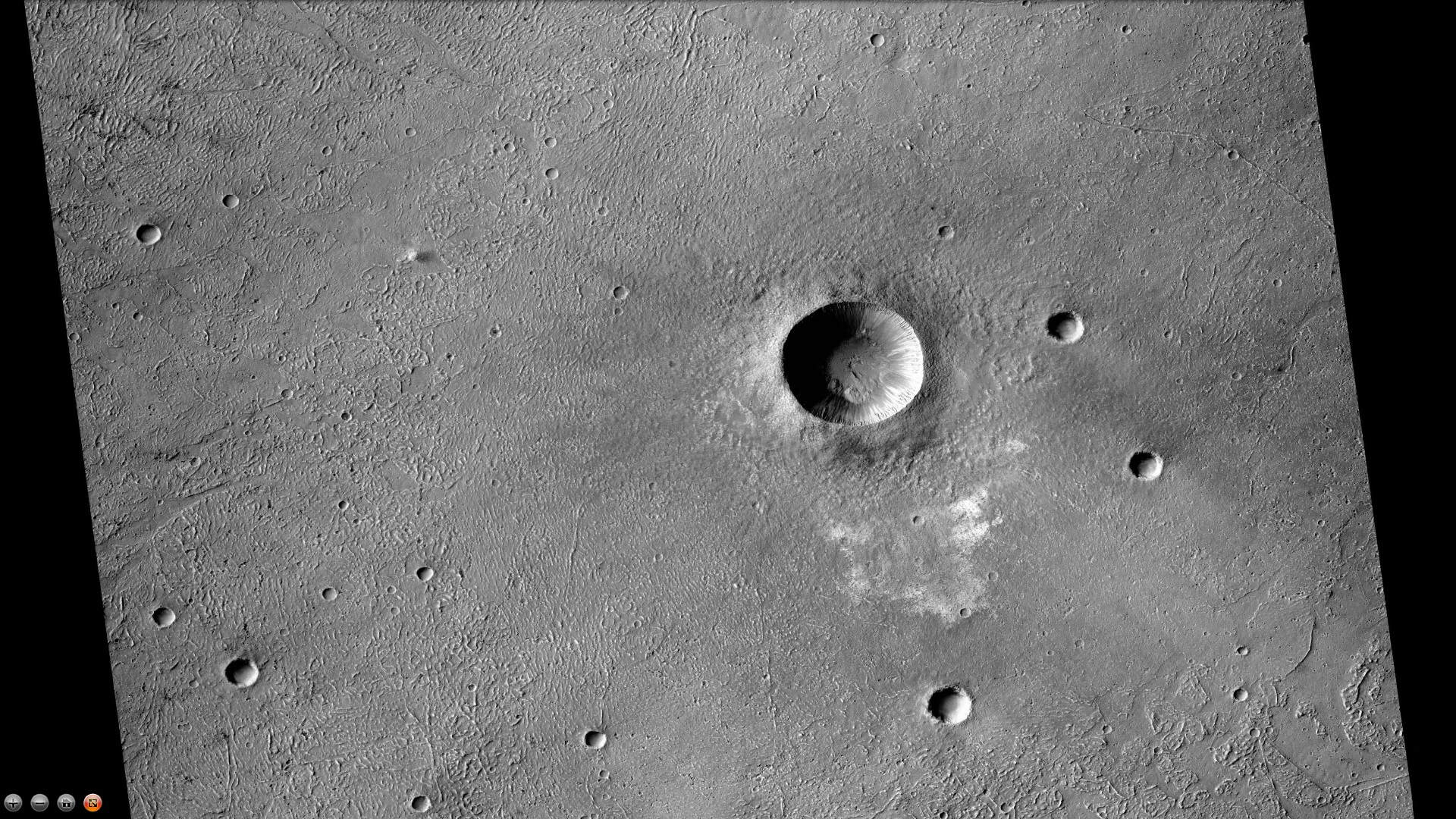
Zumba seen by MRO's CTX

A pitted deposit giving Zumba the appearance that it has a relatively flat floor despite the pits is especially interesting. These crater-fill deposits are typically composed of lightly to highly damaged rock fragments and impact melts that were made by the high temperatures of the impact event. The pits in the crater-fill deposits have not been observed within lunar or terrestrial craters. They are unique to crater-fill deposits in only the freshest and best-preserved Martian craters.

These pits may result from the interactions of hot crater-fill deposits with water and water-ice that may have been present in the subsurface prior to impact. It is not well understood whether these pits form explosively (similar to terrestrial volcanic pits/craters formed from the interaction of hot lava with wet sediments/deposits), or by collapse from the drainage of impact melts or volatiles. Since the pitted deposits occur only in the freshest and well-preserved craters suggests that they are likely related to the impact process.

== See also ==
- Impact event
- List of craters on Mars
- Ore resources on Mars
- Planetary nomenclature
