= South (Martian crater) =

South Crater
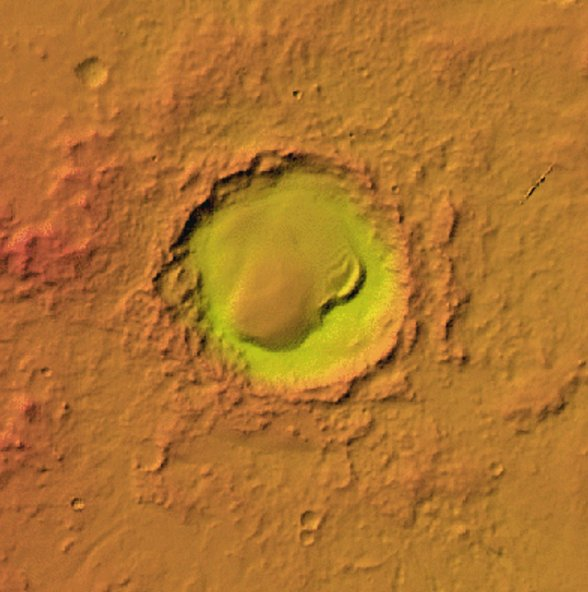
- Topographic location map of South Crater
- Planet: Mars
- Coordinates: 76.9°S 21.9°E
- Quadrangle: Mare Australe
- Diameter: 101.84 km (63.28 mi)
- Eponym: Sir James South

South is an impact crater in the Mare Australe quadrangle of Mars, located at 76.9°S latitude and 21.9°E longitude. It measures 101.84 kilometres (63.28 mi) in diameter, and was named after British astronomer Sir James South (1785–1867). The name was approved by the International Astronomical Union (IAU) Working Group for Planetary System Nomenclature in 1973.

== Description ==
Very close to the crater there are what have been named "Swiss cheese" features. Swiss cheese features (SCFs) are pits so named because they look like the holes in Swiss cheese. They were first seen in 2000 using Mars Orbiter Camera imagery. They are usually a few hundred meters across and 8 metres (26 ft) deep, with a flat base and steep sides. They tend to have similar bean-like shapes with a cusp pointing towards the south pole. The angle of the sun probably contributes to their roundness. Near the Martian summer solstice, the sun can remain continuously just above the horizon; as a result the walls of a round depression will receive more intense sunlight, and sublimate much more rapidly than the floor. The walls sublimate and recede, while the floor remains the same.

As the seasonal frost disappears, the pit walls appear to darken considerably relative to the surrounding terrain. The SCFs have been observed to grow in size, year by year, at an average rate of 1 to 3 metres (3 ft 3 in to 9 ft 10 in), suggesting that they are formed in a thin layer (8 m or 26 ft) of carbon dioxide ice lying on top of water ice.

== Gallery ==
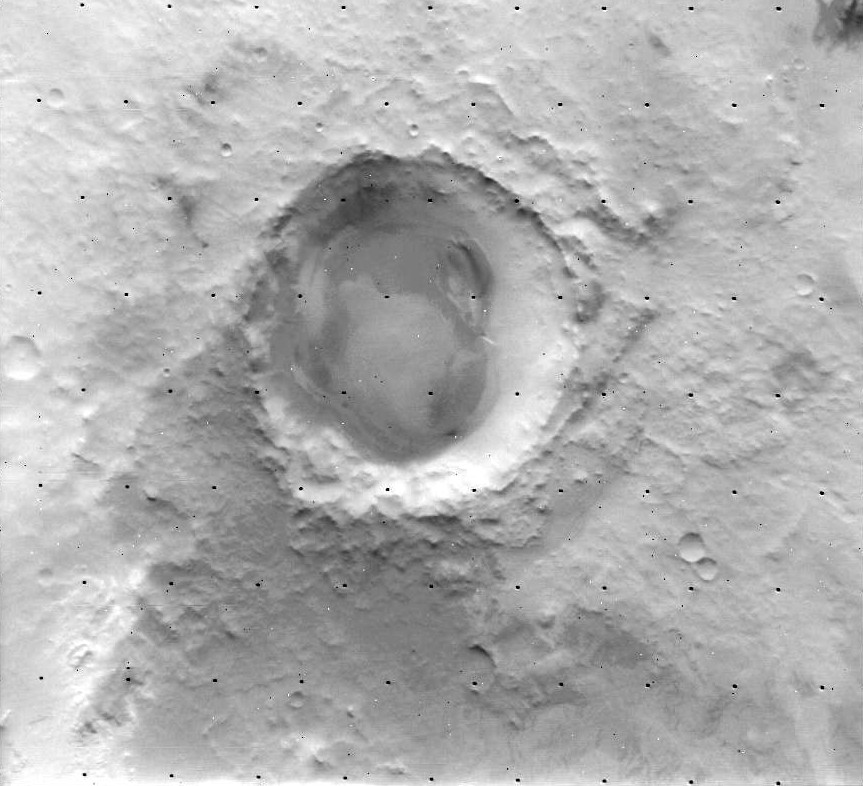
Viking Orbiter 2 image

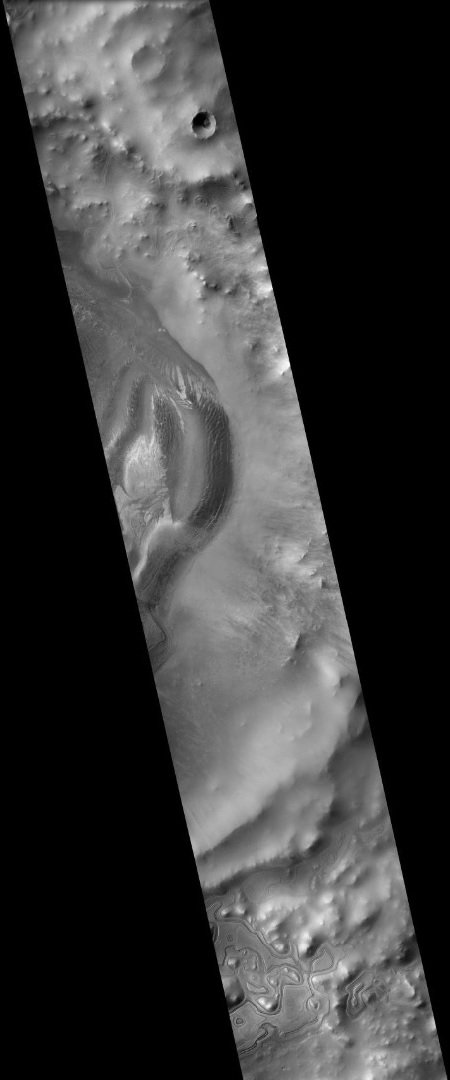
East side of South crater, as seen by CTX camera (on MRO).

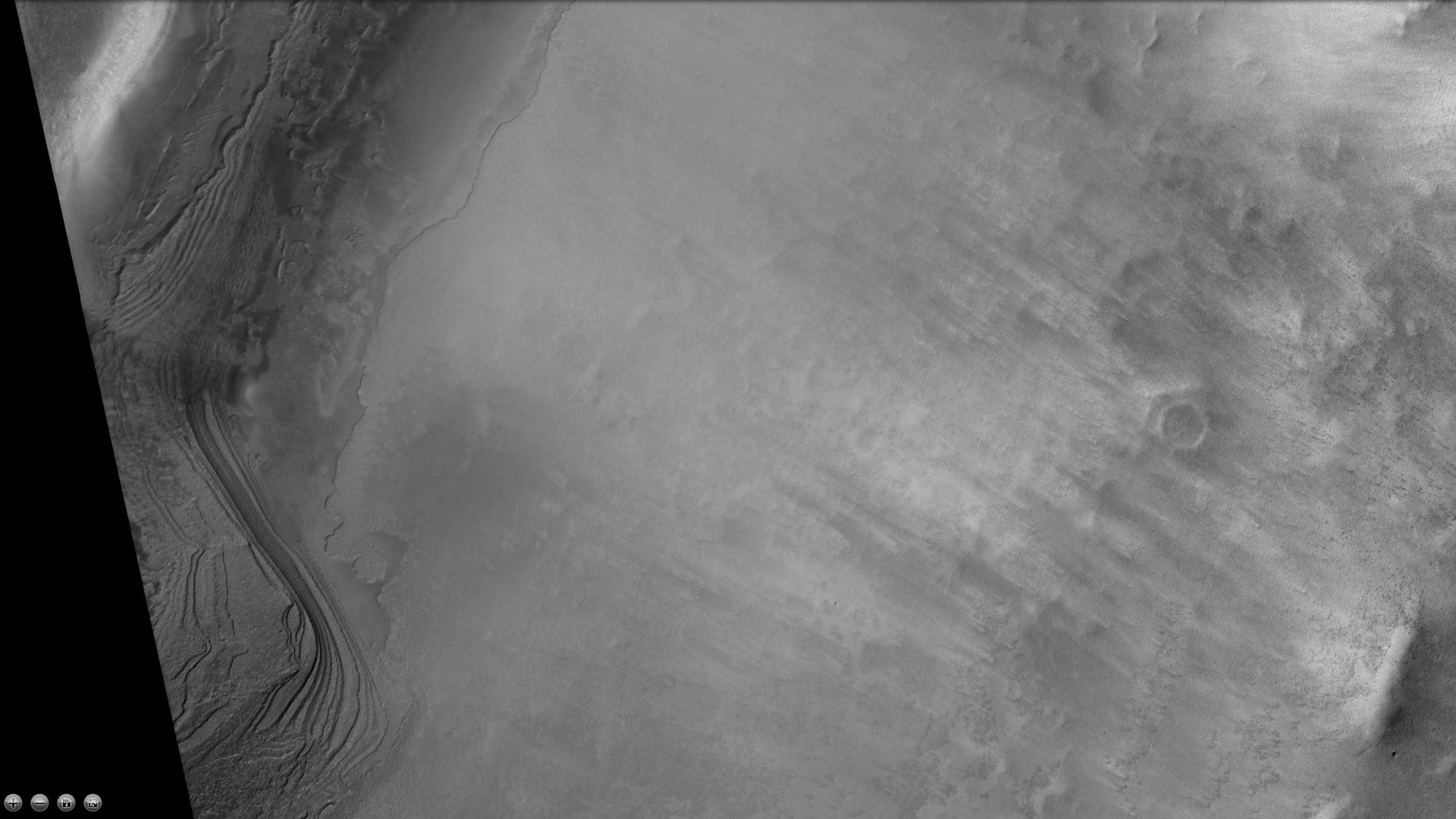
Layers in southern part of mound in South crater, as seen by CTX camera. Note: this is an enlargement of the previous image of east side of South crater.

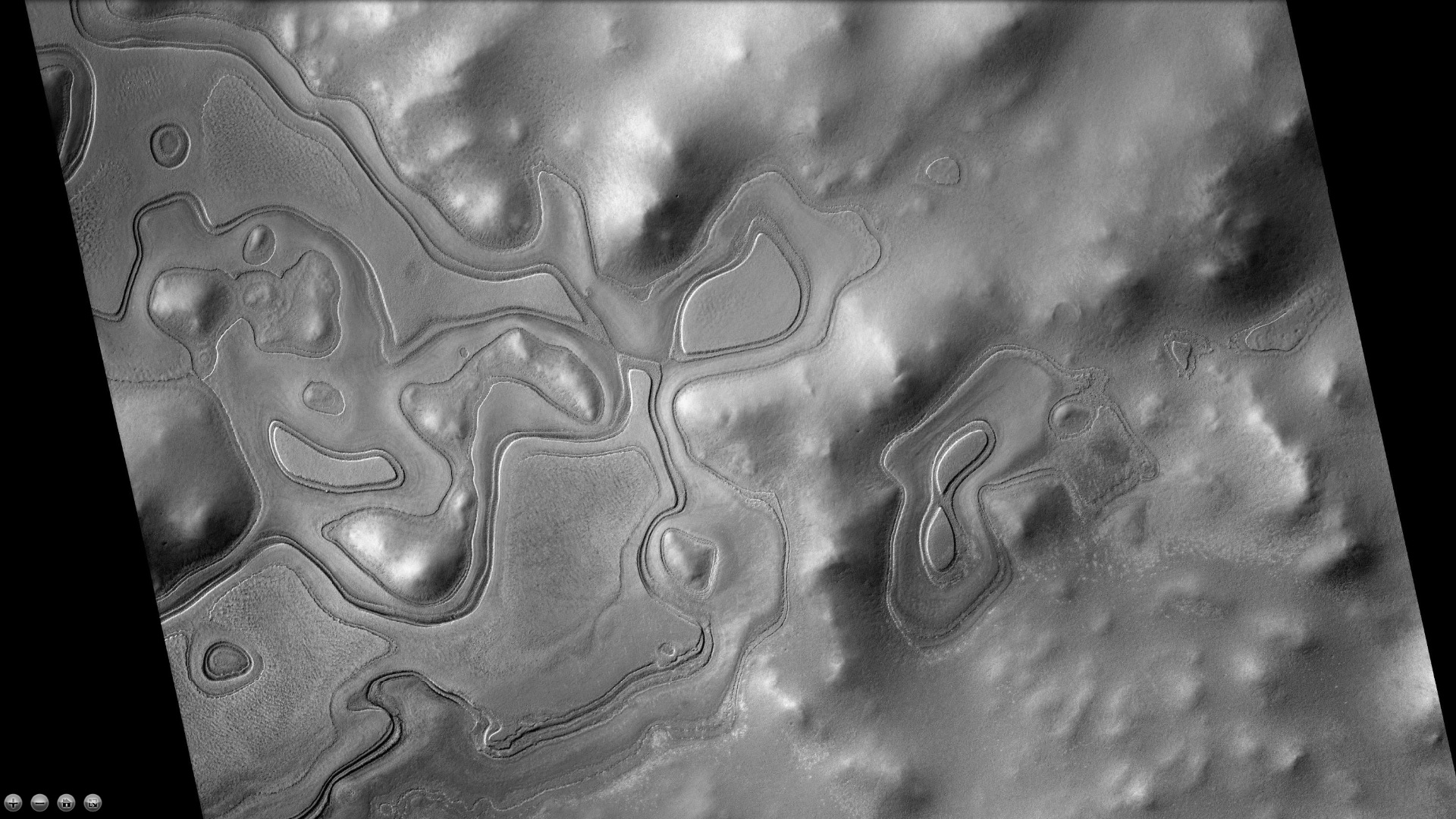
Layers just outside the rim of South crater in the form of "Swiss cheese," as seen by CTX camera. Note: this is an enlargement of a previous image of east side of South crater.

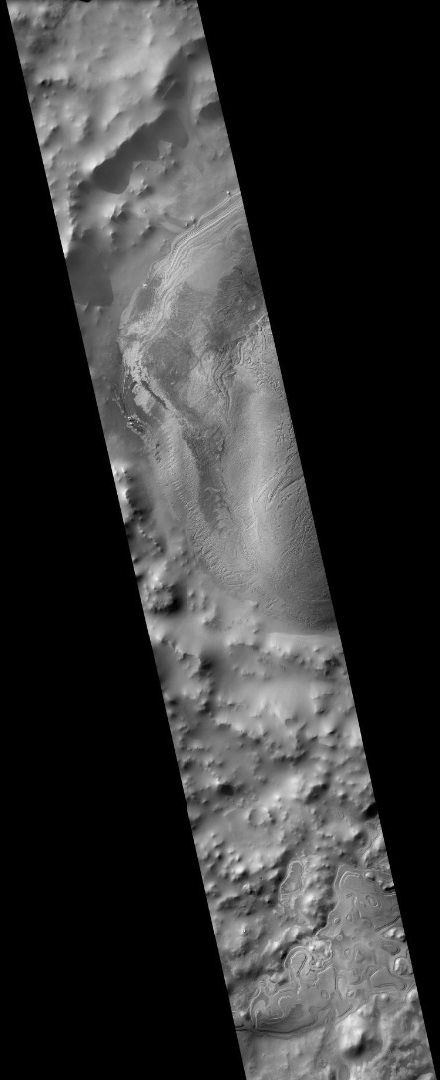
Western side of South crater, as seen by CTX camera.

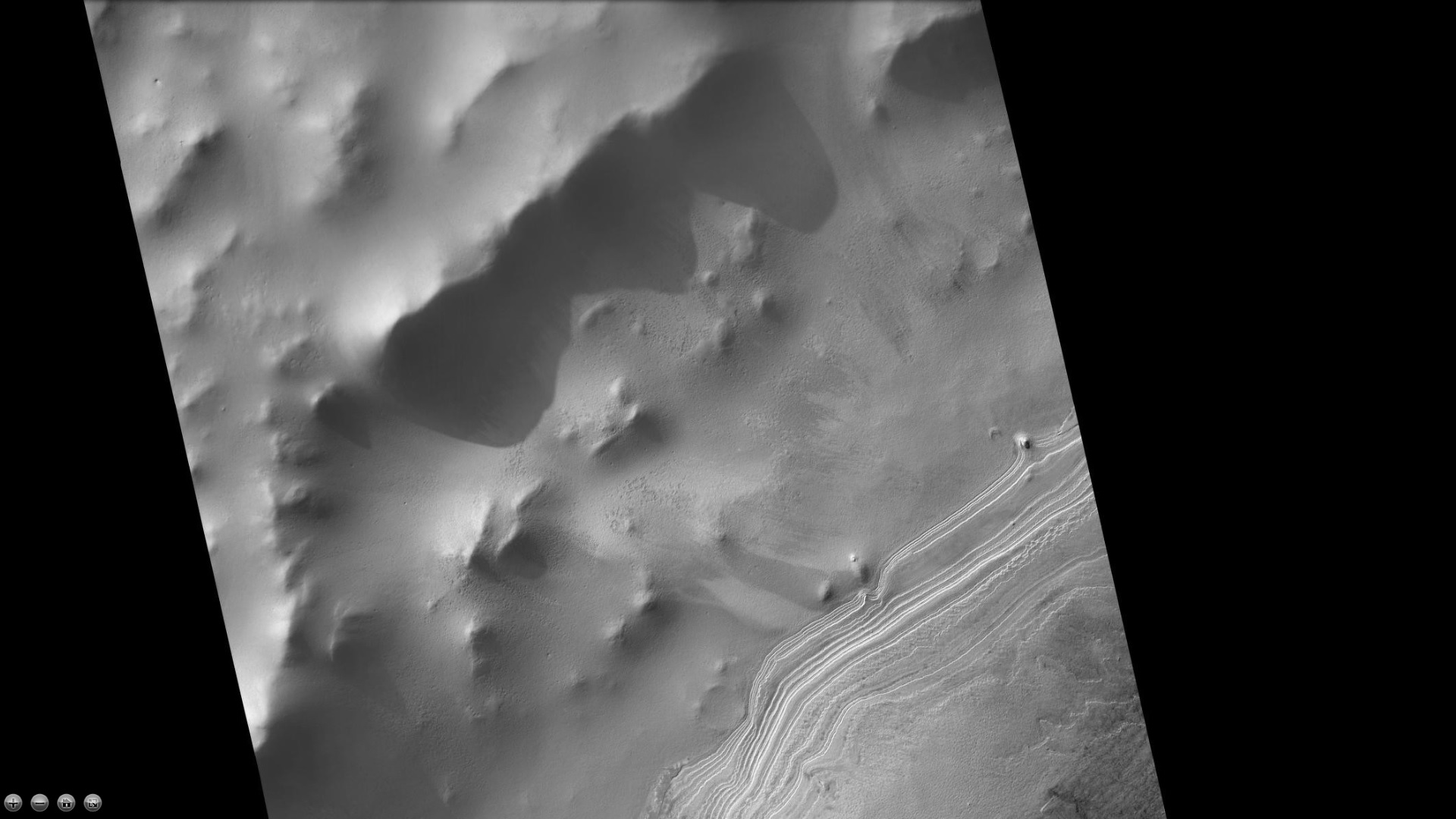
Layers in mound in western side of South crater, as seen by CTX camera. Note: this is an enlargement of a previous image of west side of South crater.

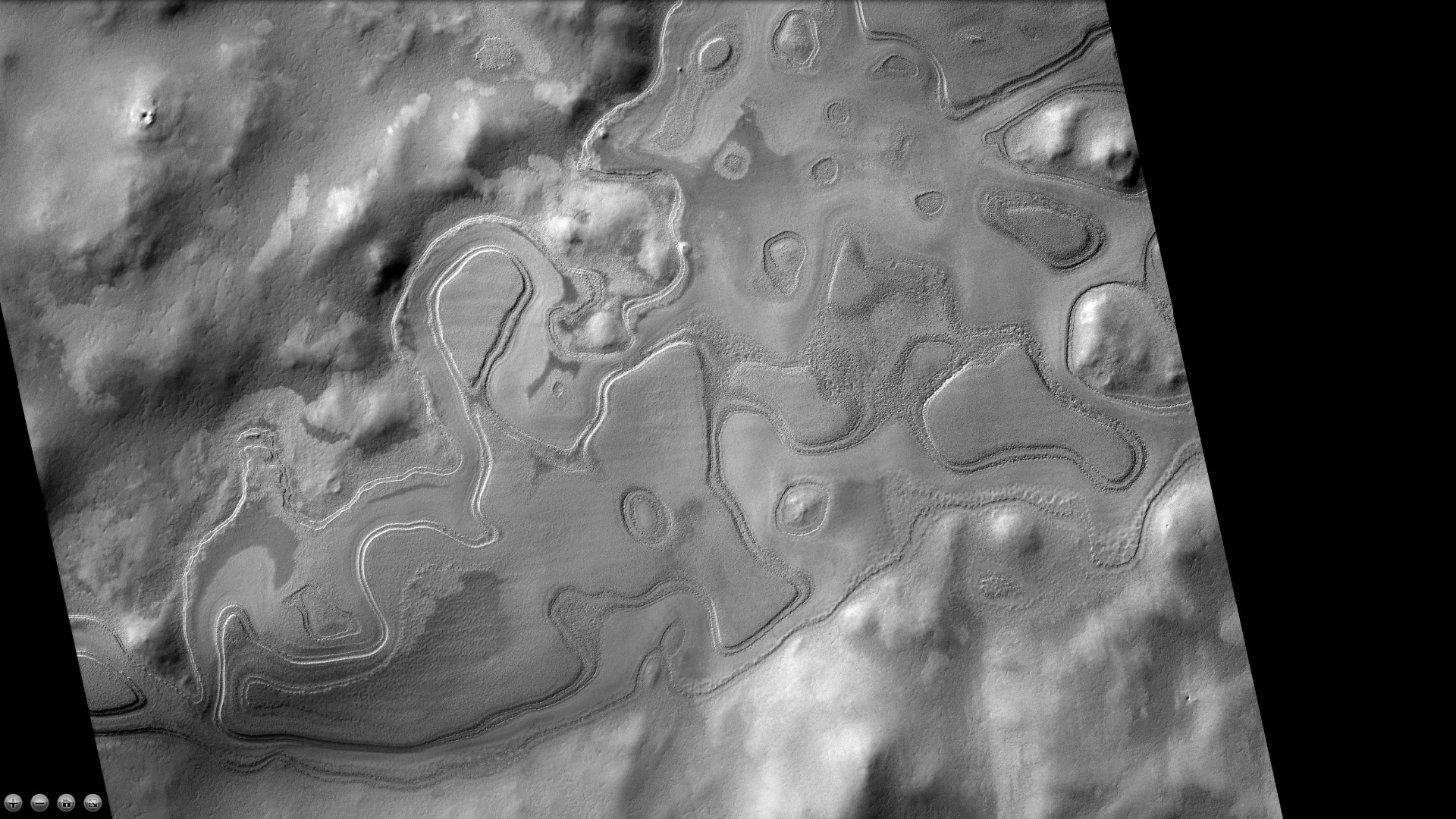
Layers just outside rim of western side of South crater in the form of "Swiss cheese," as seen by CTX camera. Note: this is an enlargement of a previous image of west side of South crater.

== See also ==
- List of craters on Mars
