= Reynolds (crater) =

Reynolds Crater
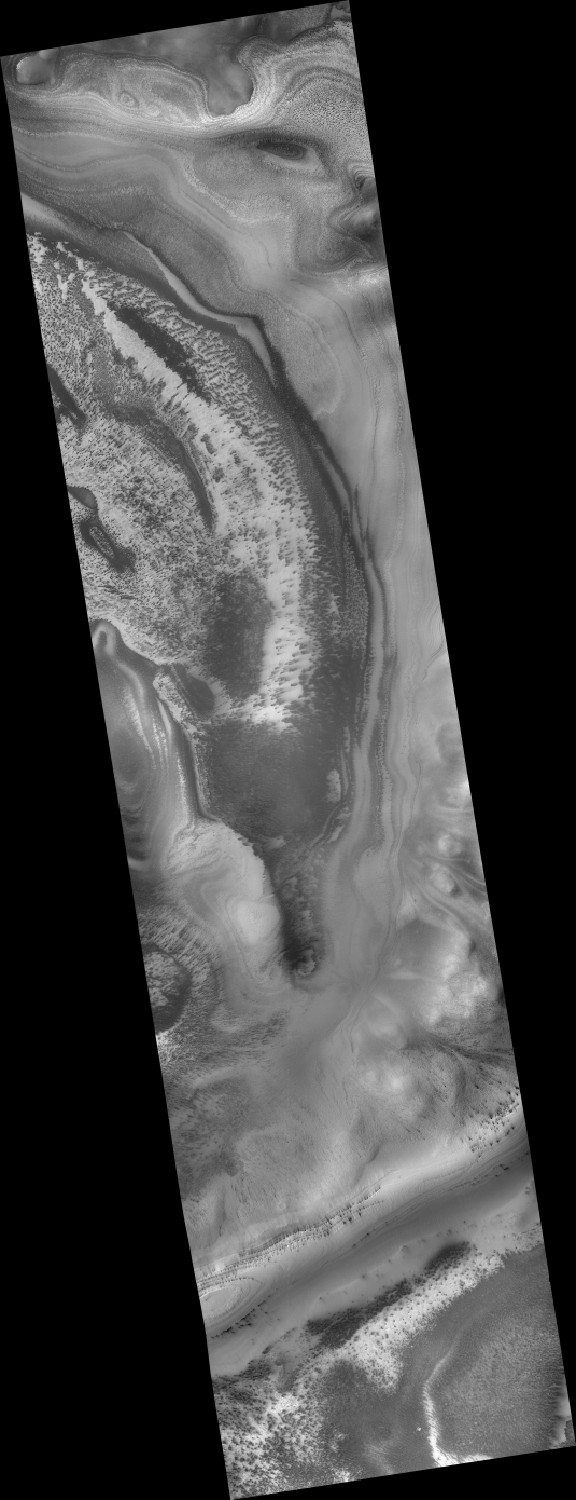
- Reynolds (crater), as seen by CTX camera (on Mars Reconnaissance Orbiter).
- Planet: Mars
- Region: Mare Australe quadrangle
- Coordinates: 75.1°S 157.9°W
- Quadrangle: Mare Australe
- Diameter: 91 km
- Eponym: Osborne Reynolds

Reynolds is an impact crater on Mars, located in the Mare Australe quadrangle at 75.1°S latitude and 157.9°W longitude and is in the southernmost portion of Terra Sirenum. It measures 91 kilometers in diameter and was named after British physicist Osborne Reynolds.

== Spiders ==
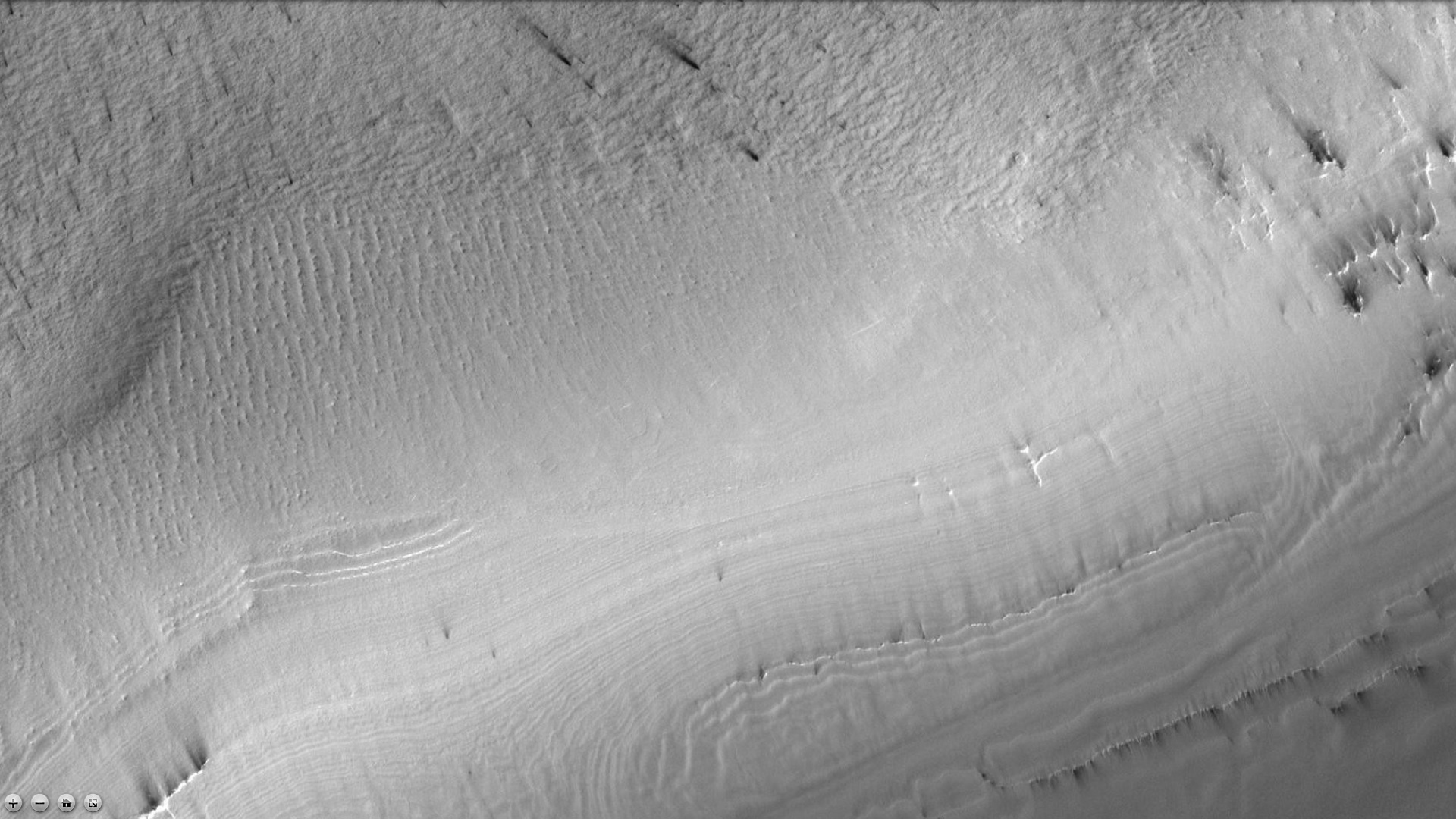
Reynolds crater showing streaks from defrosting, as seen by CTX camera (on Mars Reconnaissance Orbiter). Layers are also visible. Note: this is an enlargement of the previous image of Reynolds crater from the table. Streaks are caused by pressurized carbon dioxide blowing out dust that is blown by the wind into streaks.

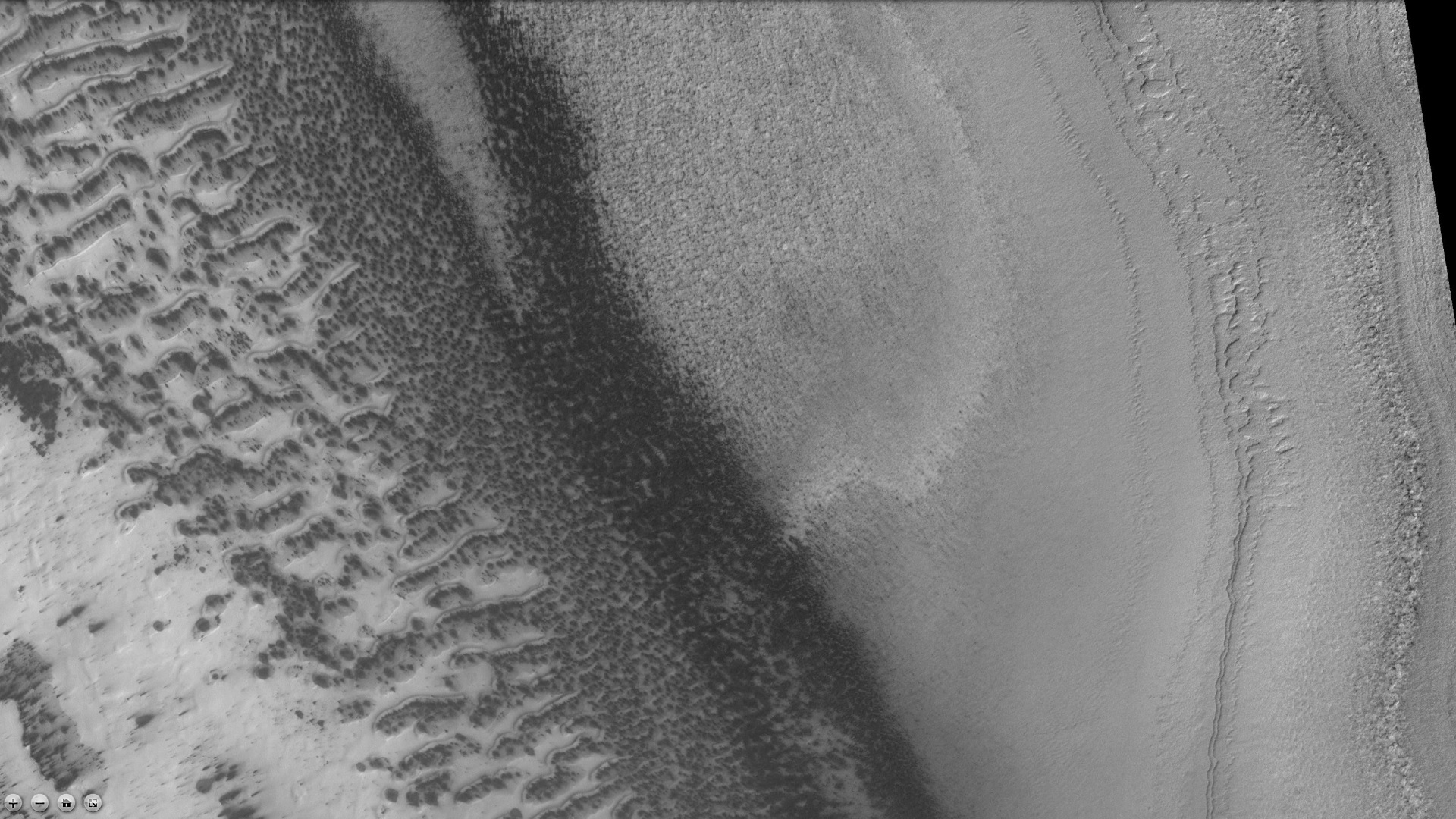
Reynolds crater showing layers and dark spots from defrosting, as seen by CTX camera (on Mars Reconnaissance Orbiter). Area is covered by frost, when the frost disappears the underlying dark ground is exposed. Layers are also visible. Note: this is an enlargement of the image of Reynolds crater shown above.

During the winter, much frost accumulates. It freezes out directly onto the surface of the permanent polar cap, which is made of water ice covered with layers of dust and sand. The deposit begins as a layer of dusty CO_{2} frost. Over the winter, it recrystallizes and becomes denser. The dust and sand particles caught in the frost slowly sink. By the time temperatures rise in the spring, the frost layer has become a slab of semi-transparent ice about 3 feet thick, lying on a substrate of dark sand and dust. This dark material absorbs light and causes the ice to sublimate (turn directly into a gas) Eventually much gas accumulates and becomes pressurized. When it finds a weak spot, the gas escapes and blows out the dust. Speeds can reach 160 km (100 miles) per hour. Dark channels can sometimes be seen; they are called "spiders." The surface appears covered with dark spots when this process is occurring. These features can be seen in some of the pictures below.

== See also ==
- List of craters on Mars

== Recommended reading ==
- Grotzinger, J. and R. Milliken (eds.). 2012. Sedimentary Geology of Mars. SEPM.
