= Mikhail Sumgin =

Russian scientist, born 1873

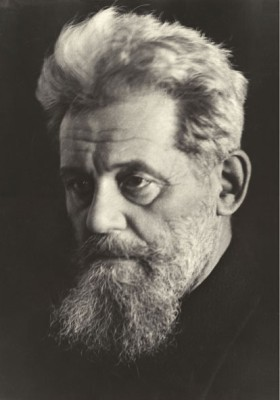
Mikhail Sumgin

Mikhail Ivanovich Sumgin (Russian: Михаи́л Ива́нович Сумги́н), pseudonym: Pasynkov (Пасынков), born 24 February 1873 in Nizhny Novgorod, died 8 December 1942 in Tashkent) was a Russian permafrost scientist, one of the organizers of the Permanent Commission for the Study of Permafrost (постоянной Комиссии по изучению вечной мерзлоты; КИВМ), and deputy director of the Obruchev Institute of Permafrost Studies of the Academy of Sciences of the Soviet Union from 1939 to 1956.

== Early life and education ==
Mikhail Sumgin was born on 12 February 1873, in the village of Krapivka in the Lukoyanovsky District of Nizhny Novgorod Oblast. He was a Mordvinian of Erzya descent.

He attended a parish school for three years, and then studied at Lukoyanovsky City School. He graduated in 1887, the same time as Alexei Petrovsky, who later became a renowned scientist as well and developed methods of determining the depth of rocks in permafrost.
