= Palos (crater) =

Crater on Mars

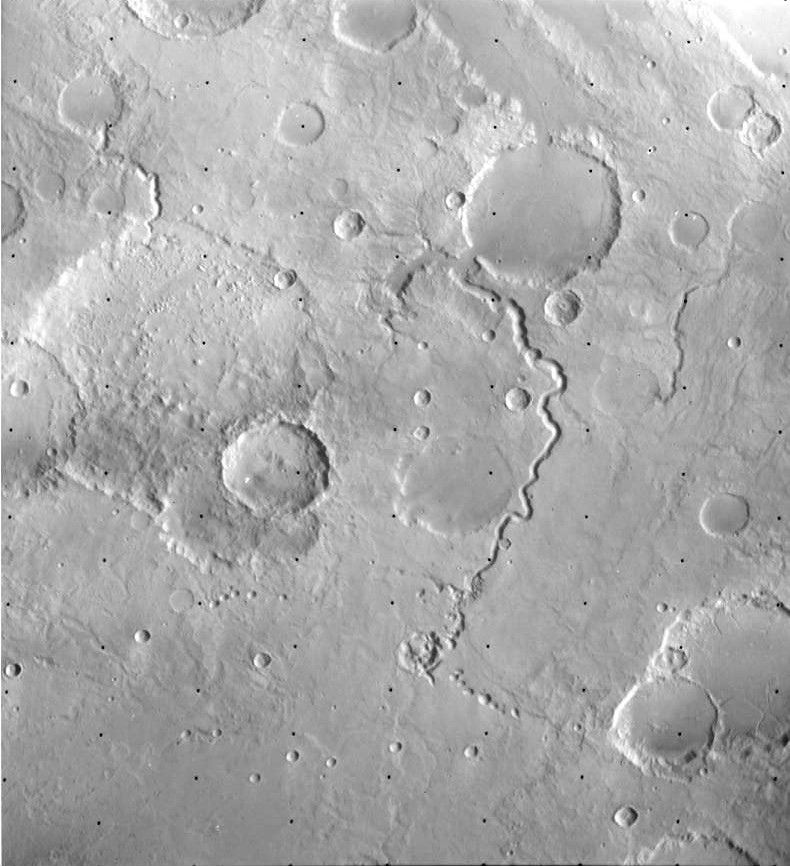
- Palos crater (upper right) and Tinto Vallis (right). Viking Orbiter 1 image.
- Planet: Mars
- Region: Tyrrhenum quadrangle
- Coordinates: 2.69°S 110.9°E
- Quadrangle: Mare Tyrrhenum
- Diameter: 54.82 km
- Eponym: Palos, Spain

Palos is an impact crater on Mars, located on the southern margin of Amenthes Planum. Its name was approved in 2000, and refers to Palos de la Frontera, a town in Spain.

Tinto Vallis ends in Palos crater, breaching the southwestern rim. Water flowed through Tinto Vallis and probably pooled in Palos before exiting in the gap in the north rim of the crater. Sediments within Palos which bury the original crater floor were also likely deposited by water flowing from Tinto Vallis.
