= Yakima (crater) =

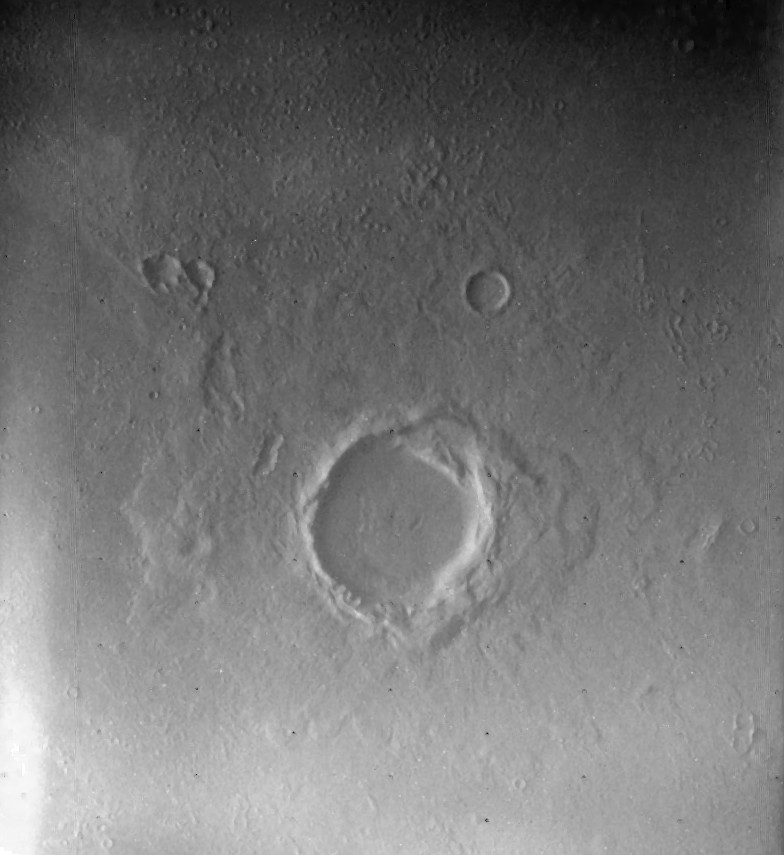
- Viking Orbiter 1 image
- Planet: Mars
- Coordinates: 43.03°N 356.85°E
- Quadrangle: Mare Acidalium
- Diameter: 12.53 km (7.79 mi)
- Eponym: Yakima, Washington

Yakima is an impact crater on Mars. It was named by the IAU in 1976 after the town of Yakima in Washington, United States.

Yakima is located east of Mohawk crater and north of the larger Bamberg crater.

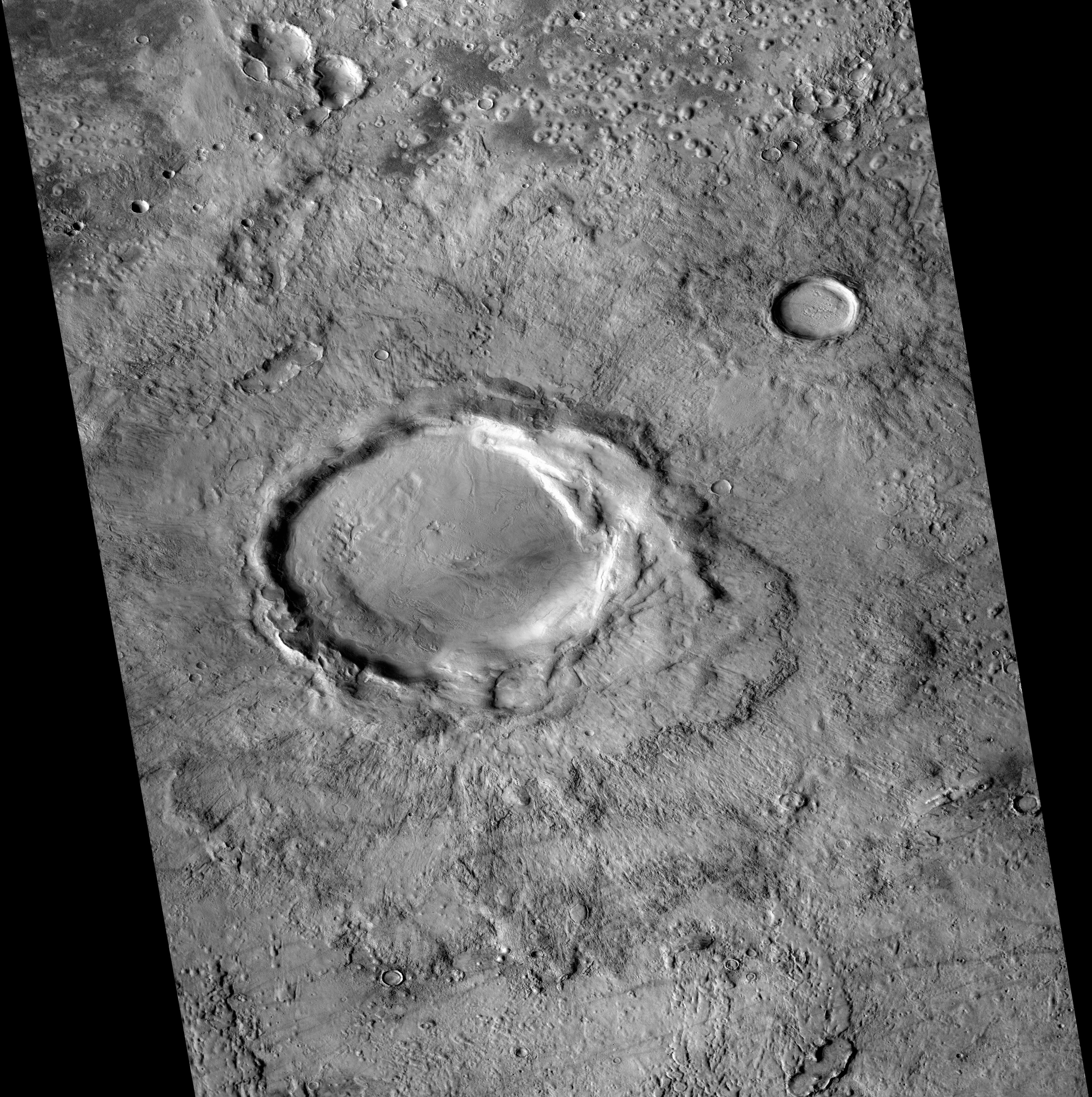
CTX image
