= Spallanzani (Martian crater) =

Spallanzani Crater
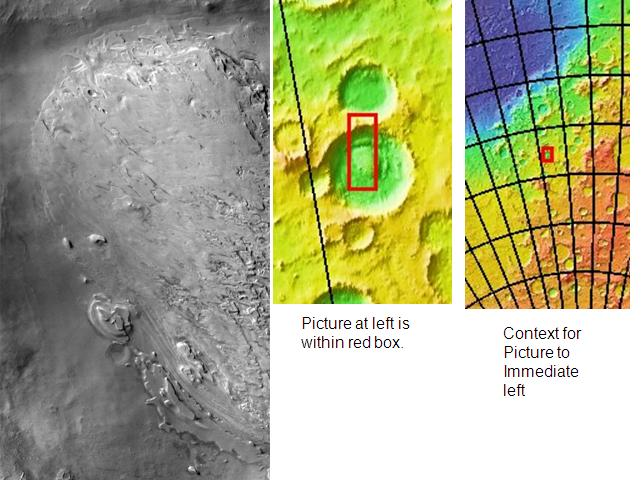
- Stair-stepping mesas in interior deposit of Spallanzani Crater, as seen by THEMIS.
- Planet: Mars
- Coordinates: 58.0°S 86.4°E
- Quadrangle: Hellas
- Diameter: 71.69 km (44.55 mi)
- Eponym: Lazzaro Spallanzani, an Italian biologist (1729–1799)

Spallanzani is a crater on Mars, located in the Hellas quadrangle at 58.0° south latitude and 86.4° east longitude. It measures 71.69 kilometres (44.55 mi) in diameter, and was named after Italian biologist Lazzaro Spallanzani (1729–1799). The name was adopted by IAU's Working Group for Planetary System Nomenclature in 1973.

== Description ==
Pictures from orbiting spacecraft have shown many layers on the floor of the crater.

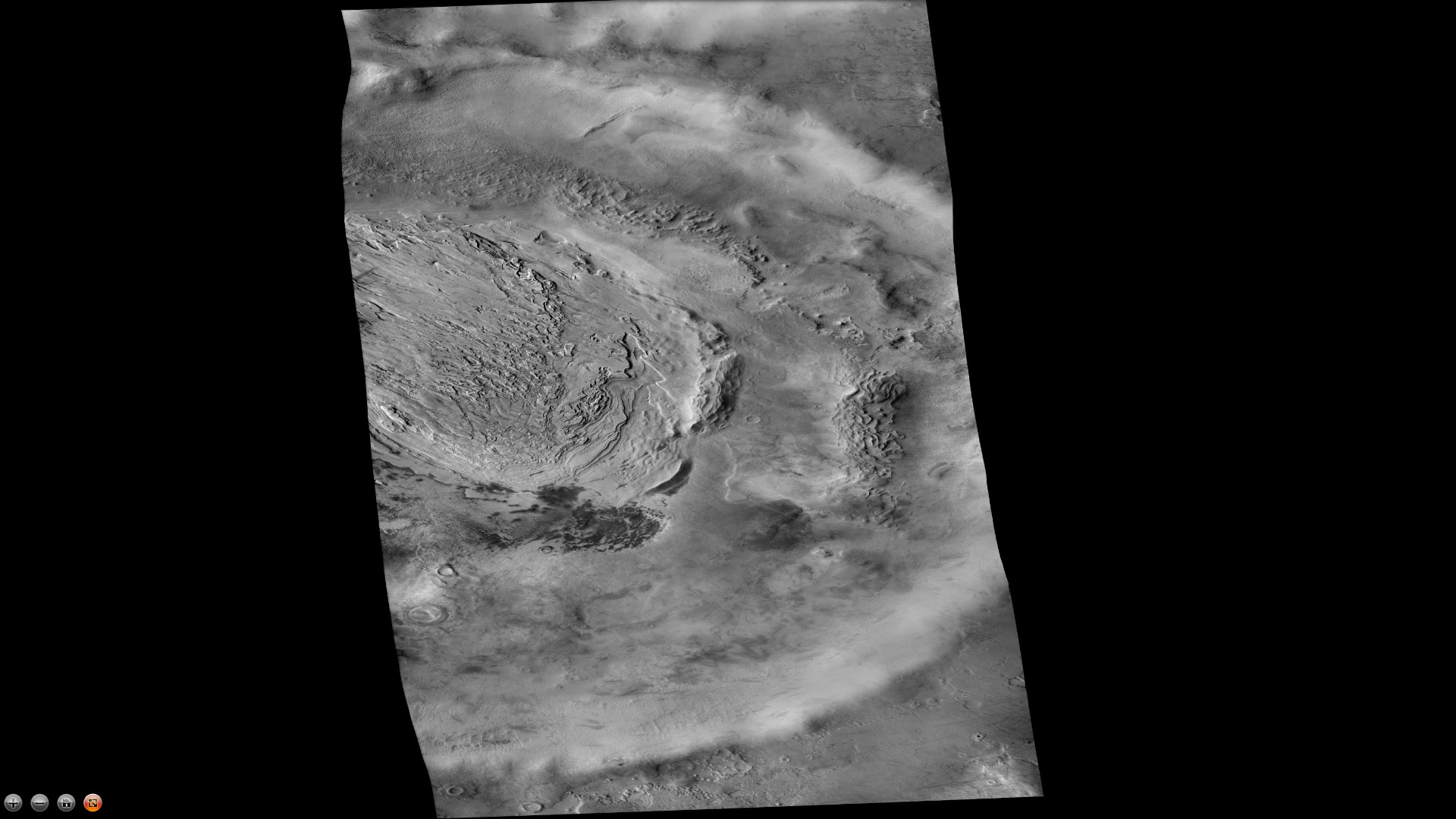
Spallanzani Crater with layers, as seen by CTX camera (on Mars Reconnaissance Orbiter).

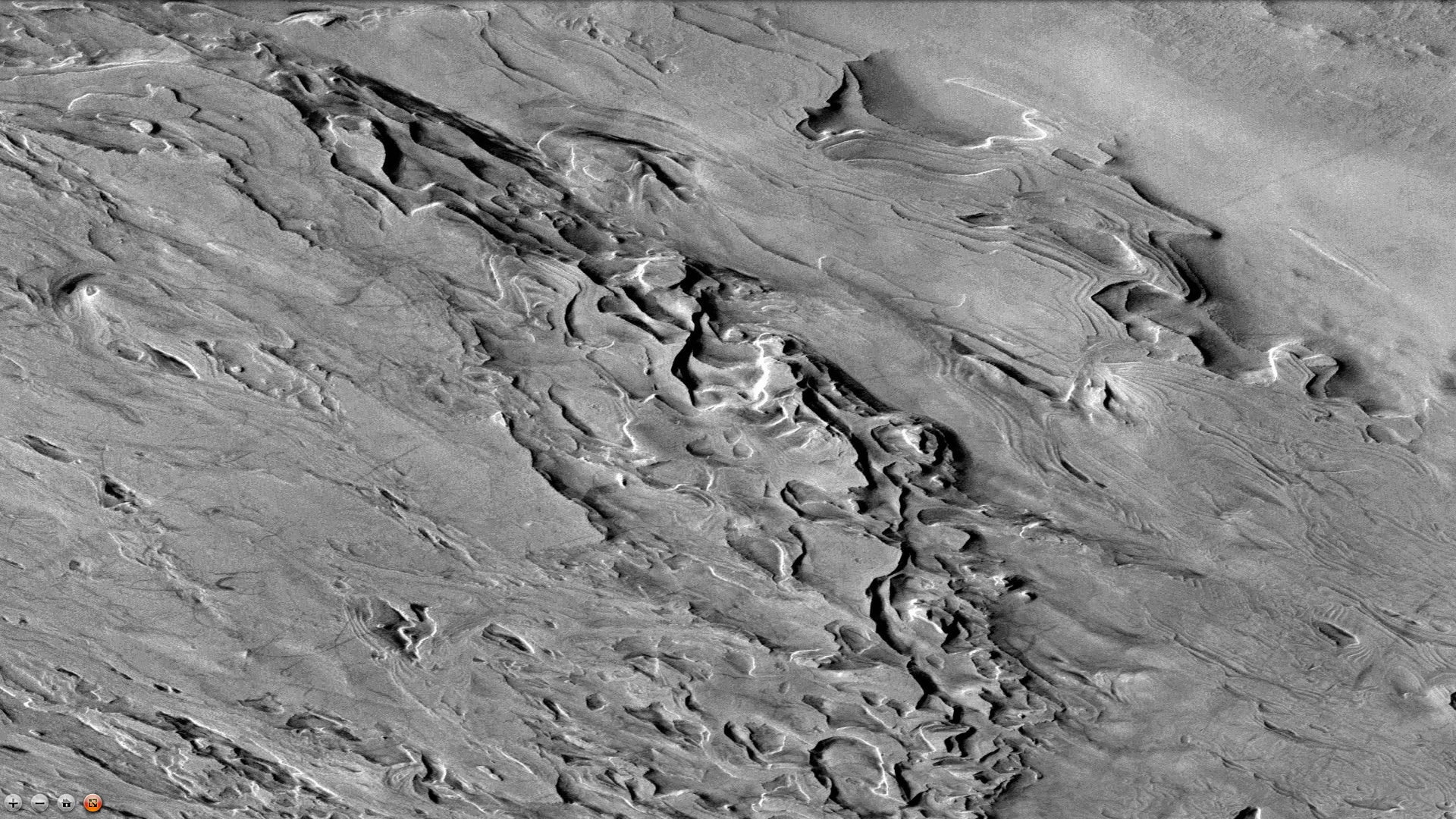
Layers in Spallanzani Crater, as seen by CTX camera (on Mars Reconnaissance Orbiter). Note: this is an enlargement of the northern side of previous image.

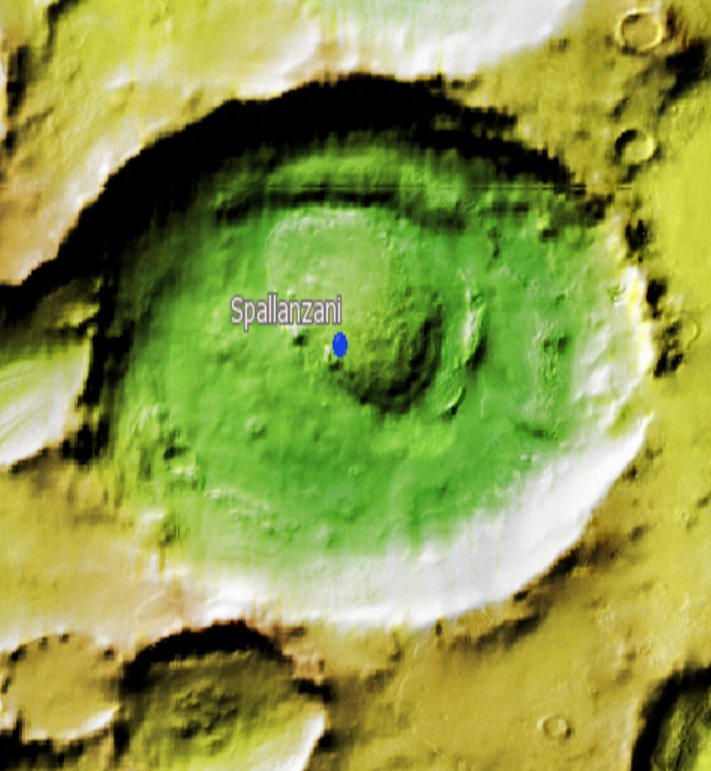
Topographic location of Spallanzani crater

Many places on Mars show rocks arranged in layers. Rock can form layers in a variety of ways. Volcanoes, wind, or water can produce layers.

Many craters once contained lakes. Because some crater floors show deltas, water had to be present for some time. Dozens of deltas have been spotted on Mars. Deltas form when sediment is washed in from a stream entering a quiet body of water. Primitive organisms may have developed in such lakes; hence, some craters may be prime targets for the search for evidence of life on Mars.

== See also ==
- List of craters on Mars
