= Persbo =

- Location within Dalarna Location within Sweden
- Coordinates: 60°13′N 15°13′E
- Country: Sweden
- Province: Dalarna
- County: Dalarna County
- Municipality: Ludvika Municipality

Area
  - Total: 1.31 km^{2} (0.51 sq mi)

Population (31 December 2010)
  - Total: 344
  - Density: 263/km^{2} (680/sq mi)
- Time zone: UTC+1 (CET)
  - Summer (DST): UTC+2 (CEST)

Persbo is a locality situated in Ludvika Municipality, Dalarna County, Sweden with 344 inhabitants in 2010.
