= List of craters on Mars =

- Lunar: 1,624 craters (31.2%)
- Martian: 1,092 craters (21.0%)
- Venusian: 900 craters (17.3%)
- Mercurian: 397 craters (7.6%)
- Others: 1,198 craters (23.0%)
Distribution of named craters in the Solar System as of 2017.

This is a list of craters on Mars. Impact craters on Mars larger than 1 km (0.62 mi) exist by the hundreds of thousands, but only about one thousand of them have names. Names are assigned by the International Astronomical Union after petitioning by relevant scientists, and in general, only craters that have a significant research interest are given names. Martian craters are named after famous scientists and science fiction authors, or if less than 60 km (37 mi) in diameter, after towns on Earth. Craters cannot be named for living people, and names for small craters are rarely intended to commemorate a specific town. Latitude and longitude are given as planetographic coordinates with west longitude.

== Catalog ==
Martian craters are listed alphabetically on the following partial lists:

- List of craters on Mars: A–G
- List of craters on Mars: H–N
- List of craters on Mars: O–Z

Names are grouped into tables for each letter of the alphabet, containing the crater's name (linked if article exists), coordinates, diameter in kilometers, year of official name adoption (approval), the eponym ("named after") and a direct reference to the Gazetteer of Planetary Nomenclature.

== Statistics ==
As of 2017, Martian craters account for 21% of all 5,211 named craters in the Solar System. Apart from the Moon, no other body has as many named craters as Mars. Other, non-planetary bodies with numerous named craters include Callisto (141), Ganymede (131), Rhea (128), Vesta (90), Ceres (90), Dione (73), Iapetus (58), Enceladus (53), Tethys (50) and Europa (41). For a full list, see List of craters in the Solar System. The total number of craters on Mars greater than 1 kilometre in diameter is approximately 385,000, with 21% of those (~85,000) being over 3 kilometers in diameter. The number of craters on Mars over 25 metres in diameter is suggested to be approximately 90 million.

=== Largest craters ===
Some of the largest craters on Mars remain unnamed. Diameters differ depending on source data. The largest confirmed impact basins on Mars are Utopia (buried, estimated diameter 3,300 km) Hellas (2,300 km), Argyre ( 1,800 km) and Isidis (1,500 km).

Crater (Note: Data in this table includes contents from: Planetary Names: Search Results, International Astronomical Union Working Group for Planetary System Nomenclature (WGPSN) at Gazetteer of Planetary Nomenclature (access date June 2017).; only this data-set provides an approval date, eponym and WGSPN-link to an object webpage; Mars Crater Database Search, Robbins, S.J., and B.M. Hynek (2012). A New Global Database of Mars Impact Craters ≥1 km: 1. Database Creation, Properties, and Parameters. Journal of Geophysical Research – Planets; Elliptical measurements (used to compute the approx. area), and the details on unnamed craters are only available in this data-set.)	Coordinates	Diameter (km) (Note: The entries containing two diameter values are due to presumably newer data being available via Gazetteer of Planetary Nomenclature. The value consistent with the Robbins data is included in parentheses for completeness.)	Elliptical major axis (km)	Elliptical minor axis (km)	Rank by approx. area	Approval date	Named after	Refs
Promethei Planum	79.18°S 88.36°E	831.28	875	787	1	2003	Classical albedo feature name	WGPSN
Huygens	13.96°S 55.58°E	467.25	484.89	450.54	2	1973	Christiaan Huygens	WGPSN
Schiaparelli	2.69°S 16.79°E	458.52 (445.76)	462.51	430.4	3	1973	Giovanni Schiaparelli	WGPSN
Unnamed	38.1°N 167.15°W	376.35	452.74	384.9	4	—	—	—
Greeley	36.63°S 3.19°E	457.45 (427.15)	438.81	395.71	5	2015	Ronald Greeley	WGPSN
Cassini	22.59°N 32.11°E	408.23	411.45	402.42	6	1973	Giovanni Cassini	WGPSN
Antoniadi	21.59°N 60.84°E	400.95	417.04	389.68	7	1973	Eugène Michael Antoniadi	WGPSN
Dollfus	20.99°S 3.83°W	363.08 (358.72)	367.94	346.98	8	2013	Audouin Dollfus	WGPSN
Unnamed	59.01°S 76.89°W	341.1	391.76	325.82	9	—	—	—
Tikhonravov	12.92°N 35.91°E	343.7	356.28	331.85	10	1985	Mikhail Tikhonravov	WGPSN
Unnamed	23.39°N 53.24°E	340.12	351.4	330.13	11	—	—	—
Unnamed	0.99°S 28.86°E	325.8	347	308.58	12	—	—	—
Newton	40.52°S 158.06°W	299.94 (312.44)	318.37	307.37	13	1973	Isaac Newton	WGPSN
Unnamed	59.53°S 83.89°W	301.99	319.91	297.06	14	—	—	—
Unnamed	24.47°S 32.12°W	300.36	323.73	291.72	15	—	—	—
de Vaucouleurs	13.67°S 171.09°E	302.27 (311.68)	316.11	297.19	16	2000	Gérard de Vaucouleurs	WGPSN
Copernicus	48.88°S 168.82°W	301.83	320.69	284.51	17	1973	Nicolaus Copernicus	WGPSN
Unnamed	52.55°S 109.57°W	326.77	343.52	260.75	18	—	—	—
Herschel	14.15°S 129.89°E	297.92	301.56	294.41	19	1973	John Herschel and William Herschel	WGPSN
Schroeter	1.89°S 55.99°E	291.59	298.12	285.7	20	1973	Johann Hieronymus Schröter	WGPSN
Kovalʼsky	29.73°S 141.43°W	296.67 (285.14)	288.89	281.38	21	1985	Marian Albertovich Kowalski	WGPSN

== Example crater ==
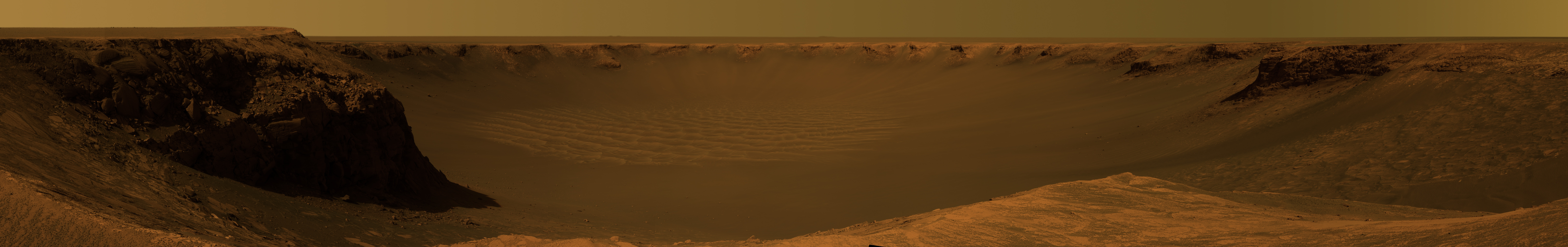
An approximate true-color image, taken by Mars exploration rover Opportunity, shows the view of Victoria crater from Cape Verde. It was captured over a three-week period, from October 16 – November 6, 2006.

== See also ==
- List of catenae on Mars
- List of mountains on Mars
