= Denning (Martian crater) =

Crater on Mars

Denning Crater
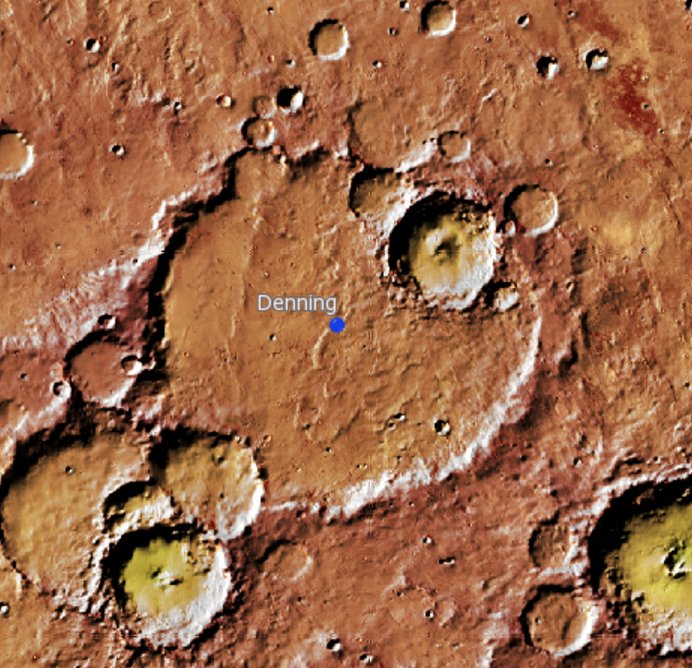
- A map of Denning Crater. Up is north.
- Planet: Mars
- Region: Sinus Sabaeus quadrangle Terra Sabaea circum-Hellas highlands
- Coordinates: 17.7°S 326.6°W
- Quadrangle: Sinus Sabaeus
- Diameter: 165 km
- Eponym: William F. Denning, a British astronomer (1848-1931)

Denning Crater is a large Noachian-age impact crater in the southwestern Terra Sabaea region of the southern Martian highlands, within the Sinus Sabaeus quadrangle. It is located to the northwest of the Hellas impact basin within the furthest outskirts of the Hellas debris apron. The crater is 165 km in diameter and likely formed during the Late Heavy Bombardment, a period of intense bolide impacts affecting the entirety of the Solar System; during the Hesperian period, aeolian processes caused significant degradation of the crater's rim features and infilled the crater's floor (which is nearly at the same elevation as the surrounding plains terrain). Similar to other large craters in this region of Mars, wind-eroded features are sporadically found on the basin floor. The presence of wrinkle ridges of varying orientations within and around the Denning basin has been correlated to regional tectonic events, including the formation of the Hellas basin itself. The crater was named for British astronomer William Frederick Denning.

== Context ==
Denning Crater is in the Sinus Sabaeus quadrangle of Mars centered at 17.7° south latitude and 326.6° west longitude, a quadrangle which it shares (among others) with Schiaparelli crater to the northwest, Dawes crater to the east-northeast, and Flaugergues crater, due west of Denning. The crater lies to the northwest of the Hellas impact basin at the outermost edges of its ejecta blanket.

Denning Crater was formally named by the International Astronomical Union in 1973 after William F. Denning, a British astronomer (1848–1931).

== Geology ==
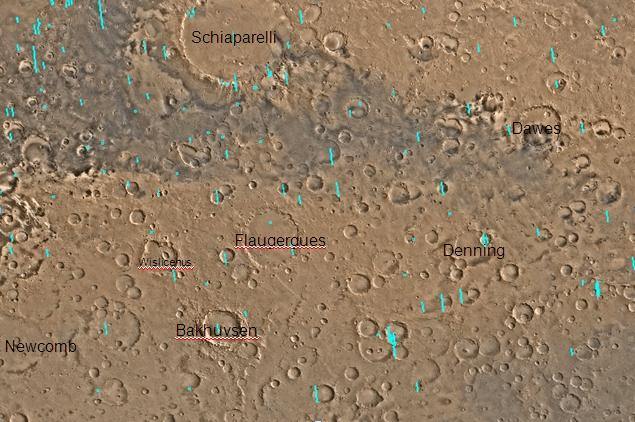
Quadrangle map of Sinus Sabaeus labeled with major features. Colored rectangles represent image footprints of Mars Global Surveyor. Hellas Planitia lies beyond the southeast edge of the quadrangle boundary. Up is north.

Denning Crater is among a series of large craters formed across the Martian southern highlands during the Late Heavy Bombardment period of the Solar System's early history (between 4.1 and 3.8 Ga), which occurred during the Noachian period of Martian geologic history. It is about 165 km in diameter. After the crater's initial Noachian-age formation and into the Hesperian period, weathering and sediment transport is thought to have degraded Denning's rim and infilled its basin. Within Denning and other craters within Terra Sabaea in particular, crater floor materials were later exposed to aeolian deflation, leaving relict knobby terrains and exposing the basin's stratigraphy on regional scales. Valleys incised by such processes are geomorphically distinctive from landforms produced by fluvial processes.

Denning Crater lies at the outermost stretches of a regime of hilly and cratered mottled terrain surrounding Hellas, interpreted as the reworked remnants of that impact basin's ejecta blanket. This geologic unit overlies a moderately-cratered plains unit that stretches intermittently across much of the Terra Sabaea region. This plains unit is interpreted to comprise eolian materials infilling lower areas in the cratered bedrock. Since Denning's formation, seven large craters have overprinted Denning's original features. Five of these craters themselves have been superposed by two other more recent impacts. A significant portion of the Denning basin is dominated by wrinkle ridges in three different overriding orientations. One of these wrinkle ridge sets is part of a larger regional grouping that is concentric to the Hellas basin. As the asthenosphere compensated for the Hellas impact with large-scale flow towards the Hellas basin, concentric faulting occurred about the crater in the form of graben. Lava emerged from these extensional faults, forming arcuate sets of volcanic material that became ridges as the less competent country rock was weathered away over time.

Much like other Noachian-age large craters in Terra Sabaea, Denning demonstrates evidence of significant and prolonged crater rim degradation, and its ejecta blanket has been extensively reworked. The crater's floor is flat (appearing totally smooth at resolutions consistent with NASA's THEMIS instrument aboard the Mars Reconnaissance Orbiter) with no apparent central peak.

== Observational history ==
The neighborhood of Denning Crater was first mapped using orbital data in 1980 as part of an initiative by the United States Geological Survey Astrobiology Center. Also under purview of the USGS, a later map of the greater region was published by Ronald Greeley and John Guest in 1987, and then globally by Kenneth Tanaka and co-workers in 2014.

A 1981 study by workers at the Jet Propulsion Laboratory discerned morphological trends of various large Martian craters from morphometric data, noting that Denning Crater's floor was at an elevation nearly identical to that of surrounding terrain. Of the different craters studied, this elevation differential was least extreme in Denning Crater.

In the mid-1980s, various researchers interpreted sets of wrinkle ridges in the Denning basin concentric about the Hellas impact basin as evidence of low-viscosity lava flows associated with large-scale extensional faulting of the Martian lithosphere, coincident with the Hellas impact. The volcanic nature of deposits around these wrinkle ridges was later confirmed with spectroscopic data. In 1992, Finnish researchers also studying the orientation of wrinkle ridges noted a north-trending wrinkle ridge set cross-cutting Denning Crater and the intercrater highlands around it. These correspond to other north-trending wrinkle ridges also seen in Schiaparelli and Flaugergues craters, suggesting that a separate regional event across Terra Sabaea induced the formation of those ridges.

A 2007 study by Californian and Virginian researchers reported the completion of a systematic global survey of alluvial fans present within Martian impact craters using THEMIS as its dataset. This was a more complete elaboration on an earlier investigation published in 2005. Although a large concentration of crater-based large alluvial fans were identified in the Terra Sabaea region, the study did not identify any such subaerial fluvial morphology in Denning Crater.

In 2018, a new study characterized the nature of wind-eroded crater floor materials across Terra Sabaea, including Denning Crater.

== Gallery ==
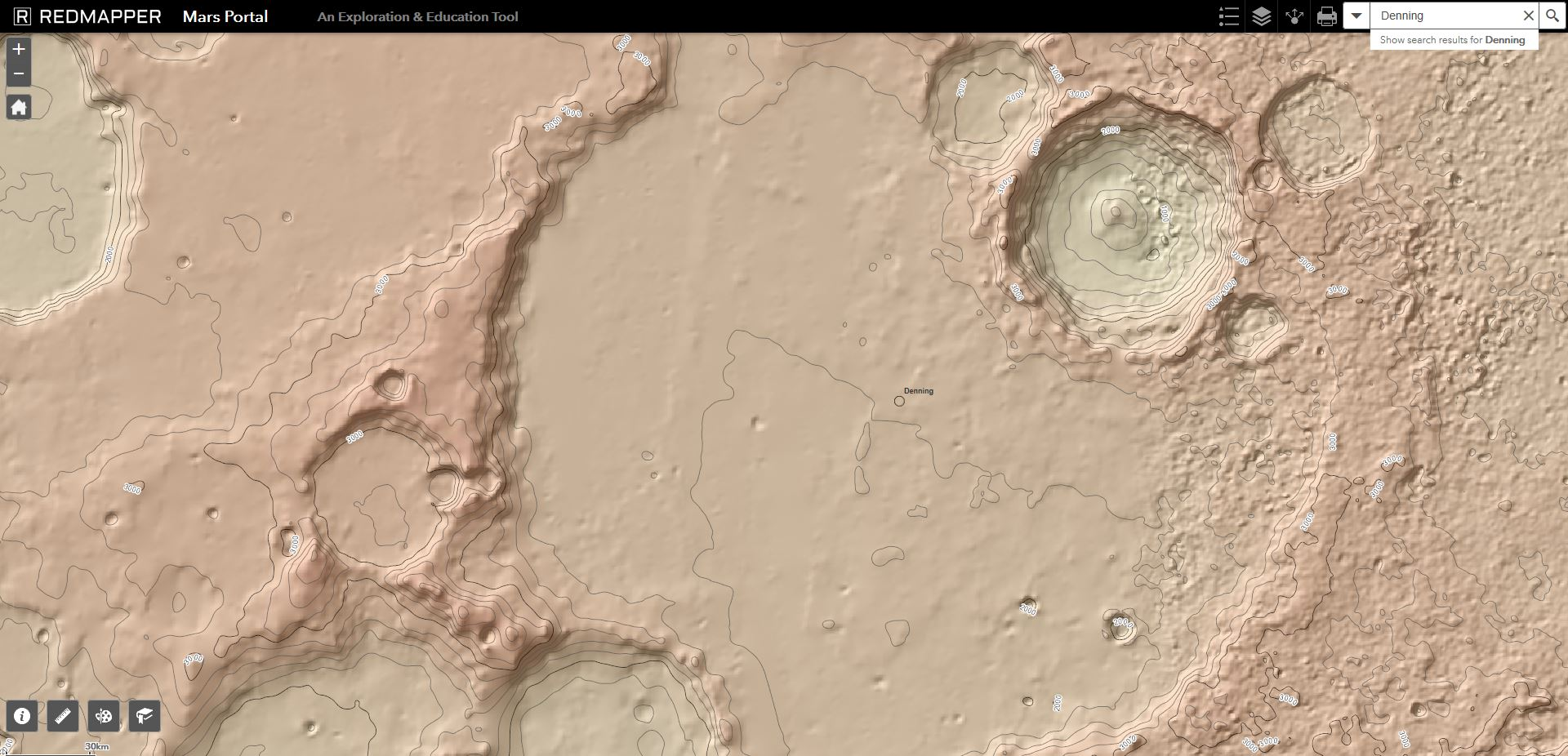
This topographic map was created using Mars Orbiter Laser Altimeter (MOLA) technology on the Mars Global Surveyor spacecraft. This image is a screenshot of RedMapper's website and shows the center region of Denning crater.

== See also ==
- Lambert and Bouguer craters
- List of craters on Mars
- Planetary nomenclature
