= Bouguer (Martian crater) =

Crater on Mars

Bouguer Crater
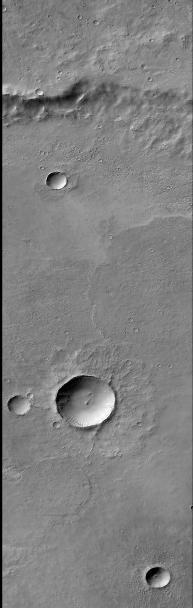
- Bouguer Crater as seen by CTX. Crater rim is at top. Small craters are on floor of the crater.
- Planet: Mars
- Region: Sinus Sabaeus quadrangle
- Coordinates: 18.7°S 332.8°W
- Quadrangle: Sinus Sabaeus
- Diameter: 107 km
- Eponym: Pierre Bouguer, French physicist-hydrographer (1698–1758)

Bouguer Crater is an impact crater in the Sinus Sabaeus quadrangle of Mars, located at 18.7° S and 332.8° W It is 107 km in diameter and was named after Pierre Bouguer, French physicist-hydrographer (1698–1758).

When a comet or asteroid collides at high speed interplanetary with the surface of Mars it creates an impact crater. Layers are visible in the crater with HiRISE; these can be seen in the HiRISE image below. Layers may be formed by a number of processes. On Earth rock layers are often formed under a lake or other body of water. However, on Mars many layers may be formed by the action of groundwater.

== Layered terrain ==
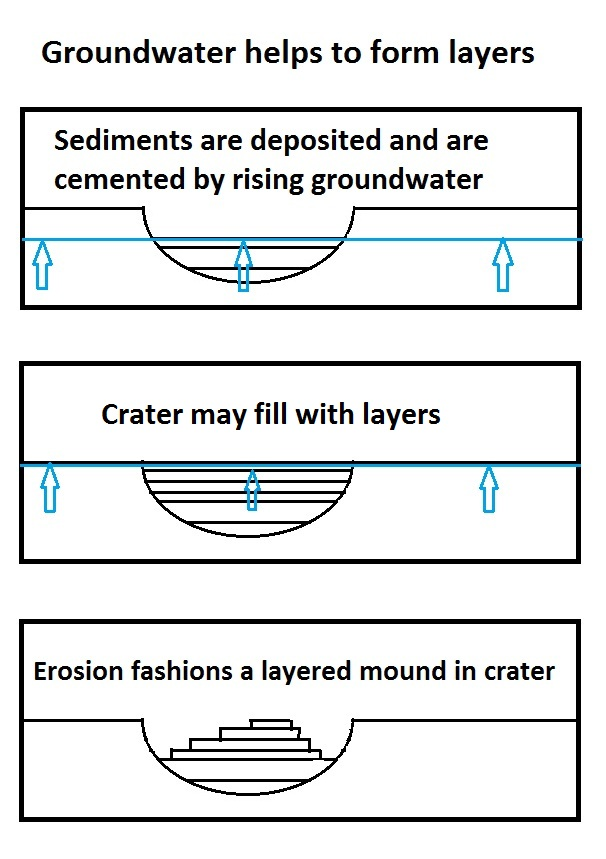
Layers may be formed by groundwater rising up depositing minerals and cementing sediments. The hardned layers are consequently more protected from erosion. This process may occur instead of layers forming under lakes.

Some locations on the Red Planet show groups of layered rocks. Rock layers are present under the resistant caps of pedestal craters, on the floors of many large impact craters, and in the area called Arabia. In some places the layers are arranged into regular patterns. It has been suggested that the layers were put into place by volcanoes, the wind, or by being at the bottom of a lake or sea. Calculations and simulations show that groundwater carrying dissolved minerals would surface in the same locations that have abundant rock layers. According to these ideas, deep canyons and large craters would receive water coming from the ground. Many craters in the Arabia area of Mars contain groups of layers. Some of these layers may have resulted from climate changes. The tilt of the rotational axis of Mars has repeatedly changed in the past. Some changes are large. Because of these variations of climate, at times the atmosphere of Mars will be much thicker and contain more moisture. The amount of atmospheric dust also has increased and decreased. It is believed that these frequent changes helped to deposit material in craters and other low places. The rising of mineral-rich ground water cemented these materials. The model also predicts that after a crater is full of layered rocks; additional layers will be laid down in the area around the crater. So, the model predicts that layers may also have formed in intercrater regions; layers in these regions have been observed. Layers can be hardened by the action of groundwater. Martian ground water probably moved hundreds of kilometers, and in the process it dissolved many minerals from the rock it passed through. When ground water surfaces in low areas containing sediments, water evaporates in the thin atmosphere and leaves behind minerals as deposits and/or cementing agents. Consequently, layers of dust could not later easily erode away since they were cemented together. On Earth, mineral-rich waters often evaporate forming large deposits of various types of salts and other minerals. Sometimes water flows through Earth's aquifers, and then evaporates at the surface just as is hypothesized for Mars. One location this occurs on Earth is the Great Artesian Basin of Australia. On Earth the hardness of many sedimentary rocks, like sandstone, is largely due to the cement that was put in place as water passed through.

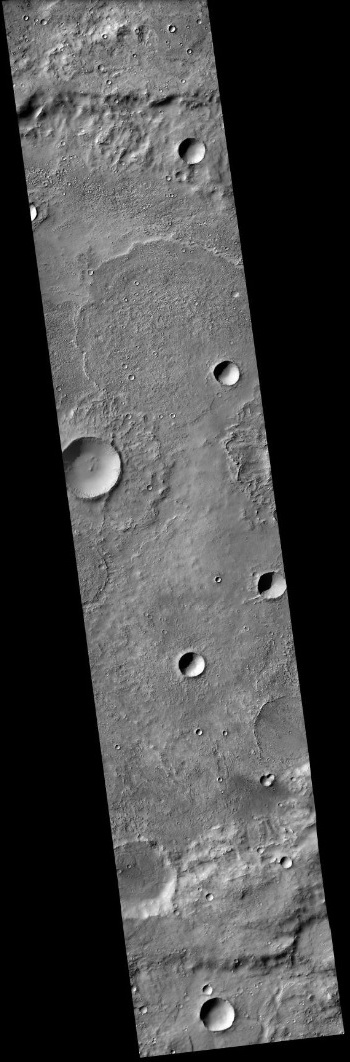
Bouguer (Martian crater), as seen by CTX camera (on Mars Reconnaissance Orbiter).

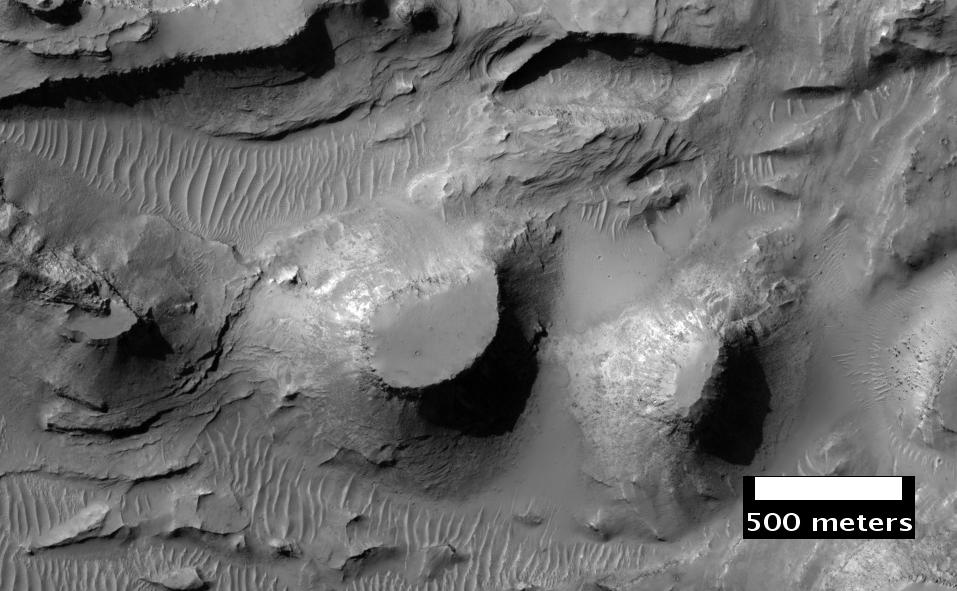
Close up of layers in eroded deposits on the floor of Bouguer Crater, as seen by HiRISE. This image is in a different part of the crater than the CTX image to the right.

== See also ==
- Geology of Mars
- Groundwater on Mars
- HiRISE
- Impact crater
- Impact event
- Lakes on Mars
- Climate of Mars
- List of craters on Mars
- Ore resources on Mars
- Planetary nomenclature
