= Dawes (Martian crater) =

Crater on Mars

Dawes Crater
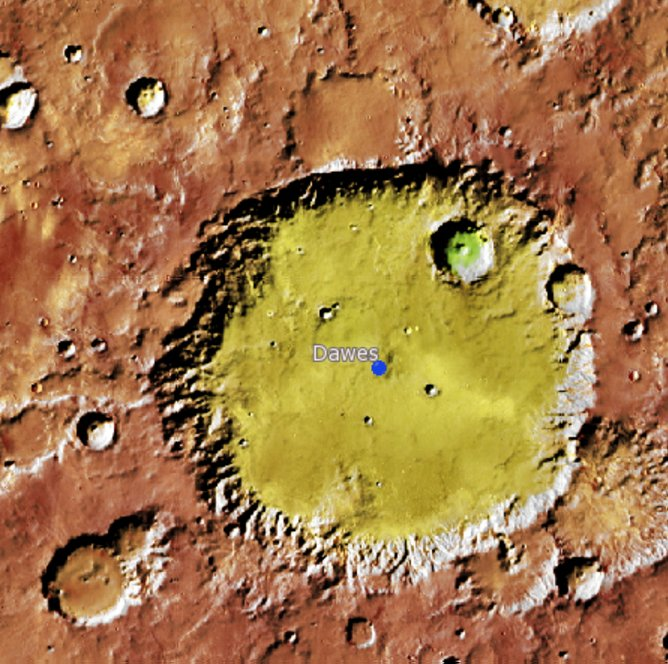
- Location of Dawes Crater.
- Planet: Mars
- Region: Sinus Sabaeus quadrangle
- Coordinates: 9.2°S 38°E
- Quadrangle: Sinus Sabaeus
- Diameter: 191 km
- Eponym: William Rutter Dawes

Dawes Crater is located in the Sinus Sabaeus quadrangle of Mars, at 9.2 S and 38 E. It is about 191 km (119 mi) in diameter, and was named after William R. Dawes, a British astronomer (1799–1868) who was ahead of his time in believing that Mars only had a thin atmosphere. Dawes presumed that the atmosphere of Mars was thin because surface markings on the planet could easily be seen.

== Description ==
Impact craters generally have a rim with ejecta around them, in contrast volcanic craters usually do not have a rim or ejecta deposits. As craters get larger (greater than 10 km in diameter) they usually have a central peak. The peak is caused by a rebound of the crater floor following the impact. Sometimes craters expose layers that were buried. Rocks from deep underground are tossed onto the surface. Hence, craters can show us what lies deep under the surface.

== Gallery ==
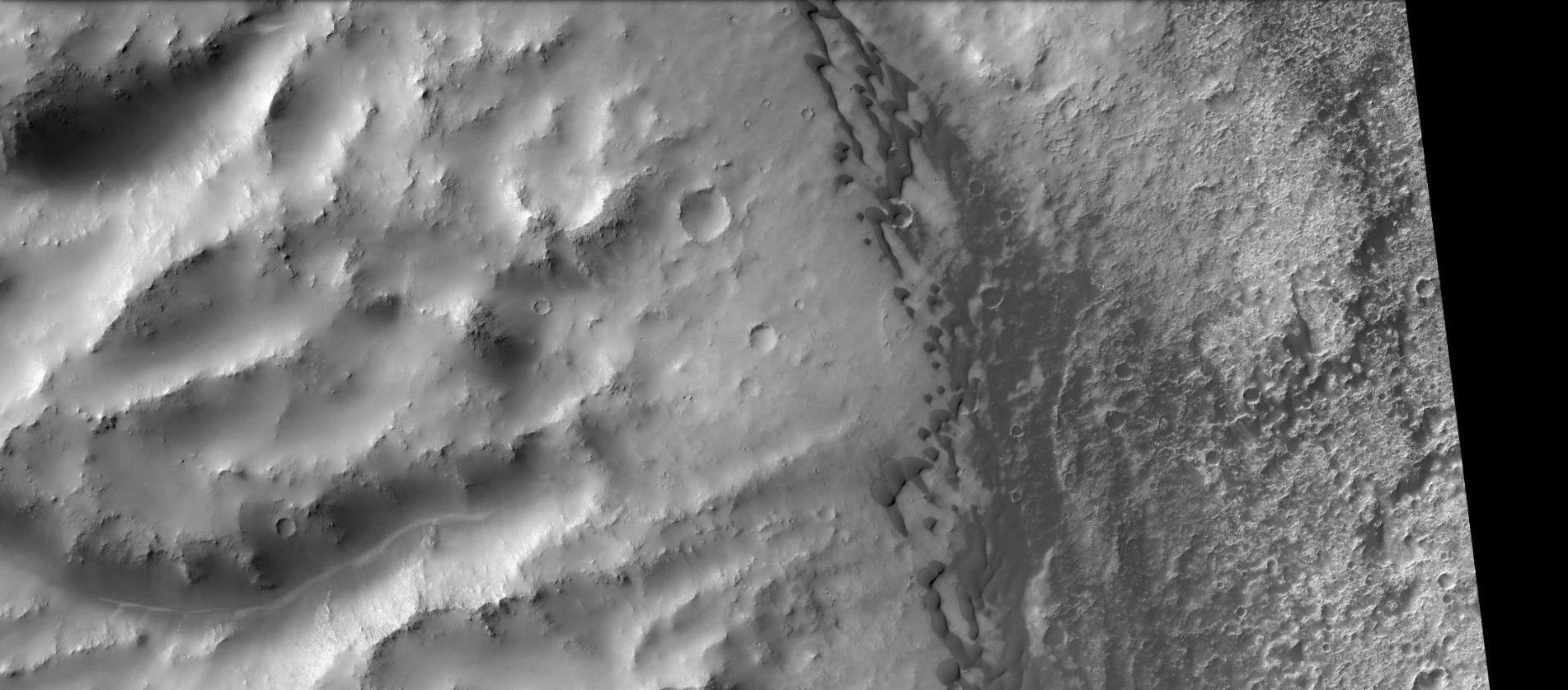
Part of Dawes Crater showing eroding wall on left and dunes on crater floor on the right. Picture taken with CTX camera (on Mars Reconnaissance Orbiter).

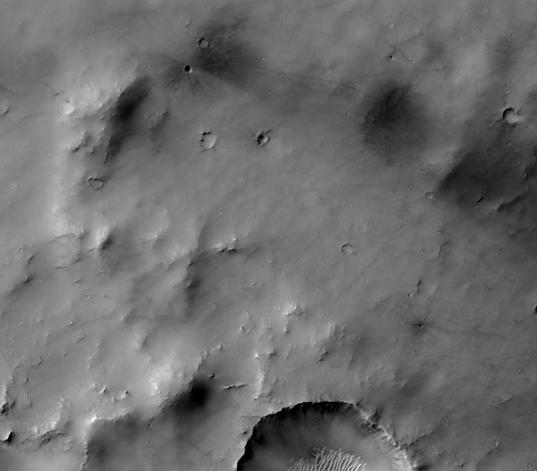
Dawes Crater floor with fresh impact craters

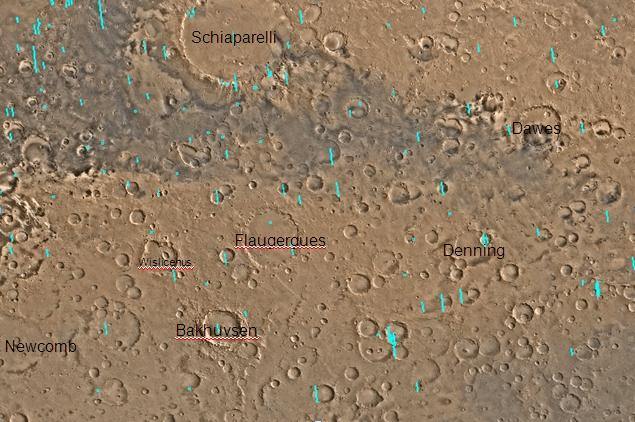
Quadrangle map of Sinus Sabaeus labeled with major features

== See also ==
- List of craters on Mars: A-G
