= Schiaparelli (Martian crater) =

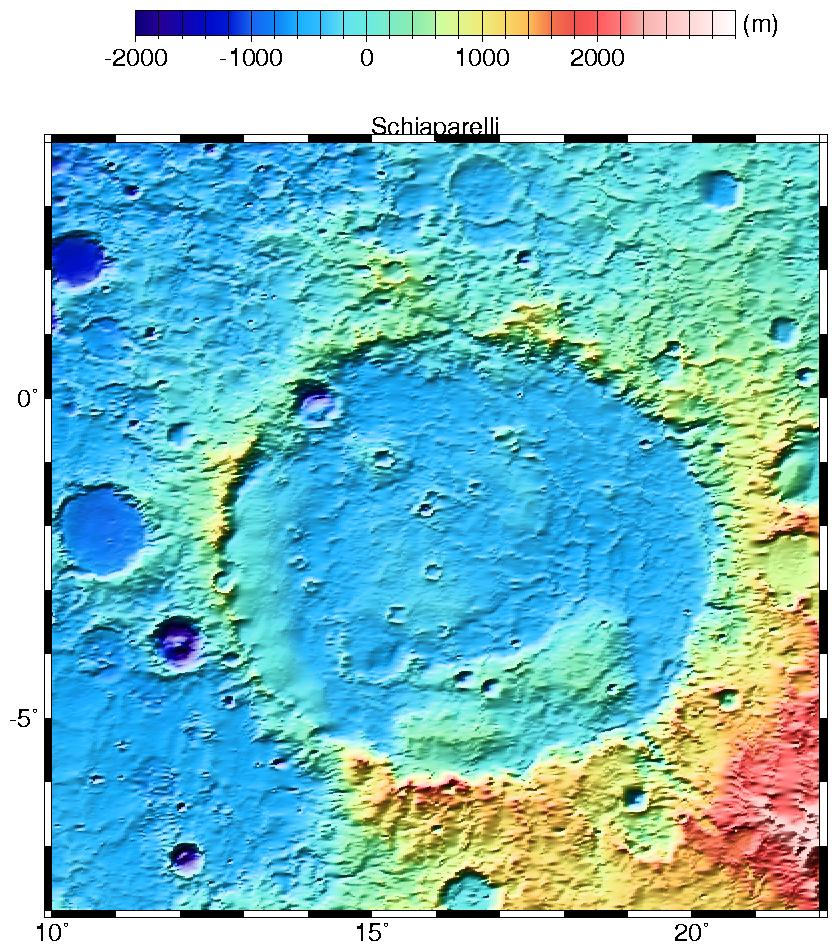
- Elevation map of the Martian crater Schiaparelli, as seen by Mars Global Surveyor
- Planet: Mars
- Coordinates: 2.7°S 16.7°E
- Quadrangle: Sinus Sabaeus
- Diameter: 458.52 km
- Eponym: Giovanni Schiaparelli

Schiaparelli (/ˌskæpəˈrɛli, ˌʃæp-/ SKAP-ə-REL-ee, SHAP-, US also /skiˌɑːp-/ skee-AHP-, Italian: [skjapaˈrɛlli]) is an impact crater on Mars, located near the planet's equator at latitude 2.7° south and longitude 16.7° east in the Sinus Sabaeus quadrangle. It measures approximately 459 kilometers (285-miles) in diameter and was named after Italian astronomer Giovanni Schiaparelli, known for his observations of the Red Planet and his mistranslated term "canali". The name was adopted by IAU's Working Group for Planetary System Nomenclature in 1973.

== Description ==
A crater within Schiaparelli shows many layers that may have formed by the wind, volcanoes, or deposition under water.

Layers can be a few meters thick or tens of meters thick. Recent research on these layers suggests that ancient climate change on Mars, caused by regular variation in the planet's tilt, may have caused the patterns in layers. On Earth, similar changes (astronomical forcing) of climate results in ice-age cycles and formation of rhythmites.

The regular appearance of rock layers suggests that regular changes in climate may be the root cause. Regular changes in climate may be due to variations of a planet's tilt (called obliquity). The tilt of the Earth's axis changes by only a little more than 2 degrees since the Moon is relatively large. In contrast Mars's tilt varies by tens of degrees. When the tilt is low (current situation on Mars), the poles are the coldest places on the planet, while the equator is the warmest (as on Earth). This could cause gases in the atmosphere, like water and carbon dioxide, to migrate poleward, where they would freeze. When the obliquity is higher, the poles receive more sunlight, causing those materials to migrate away. When carbon dioxide moves from the Martian poles, the atmospheric pressure increases, possibly causing a difference in the ability of winds to transport and deposit sand. Also, with more water in the atmosphere sand grains may stick and cement together to form layers.

== Location on Mars ==
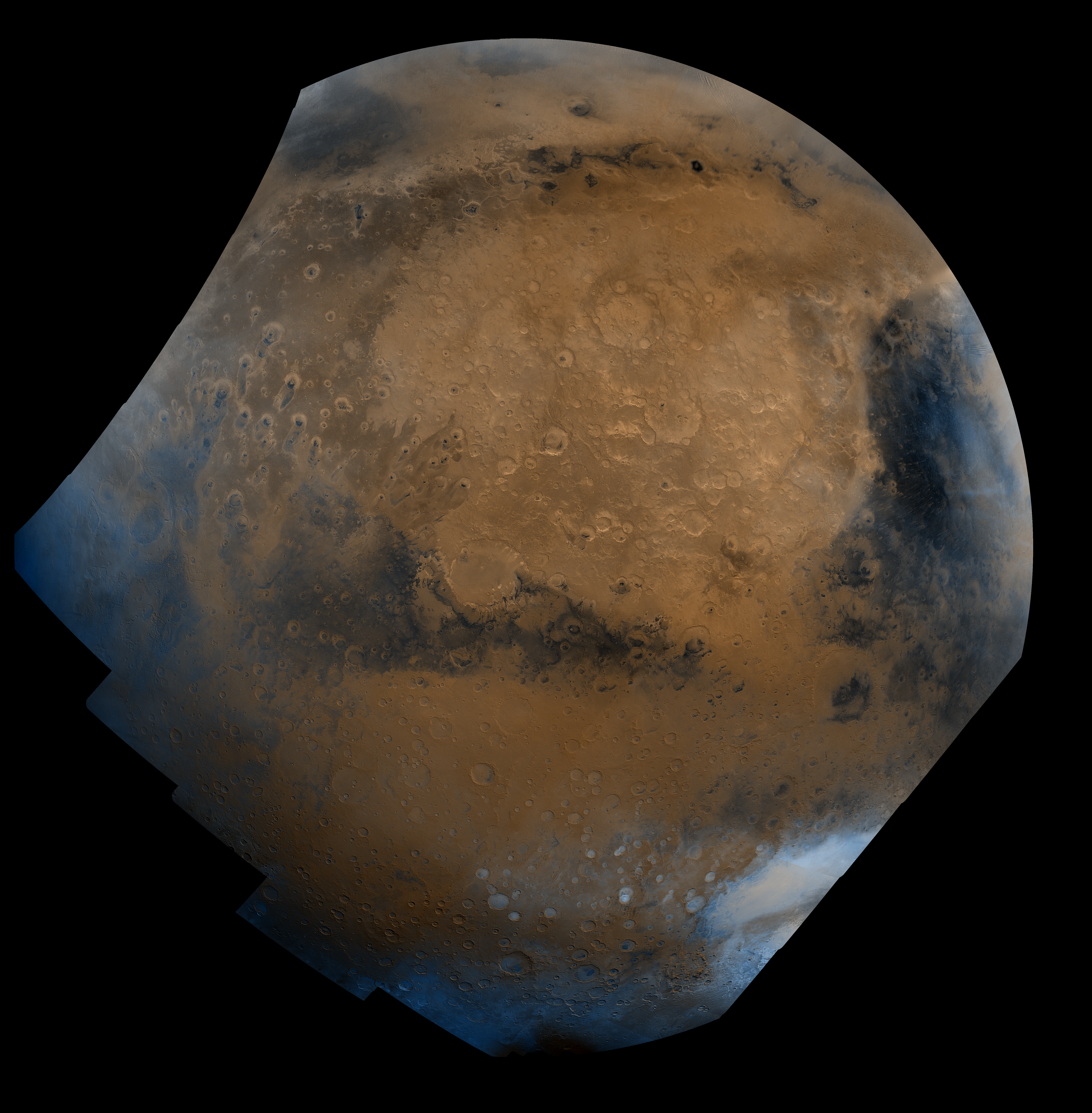
The Martian crater Schiaparelli is in the center of this 1980 mosaic from the Viking orbiter.

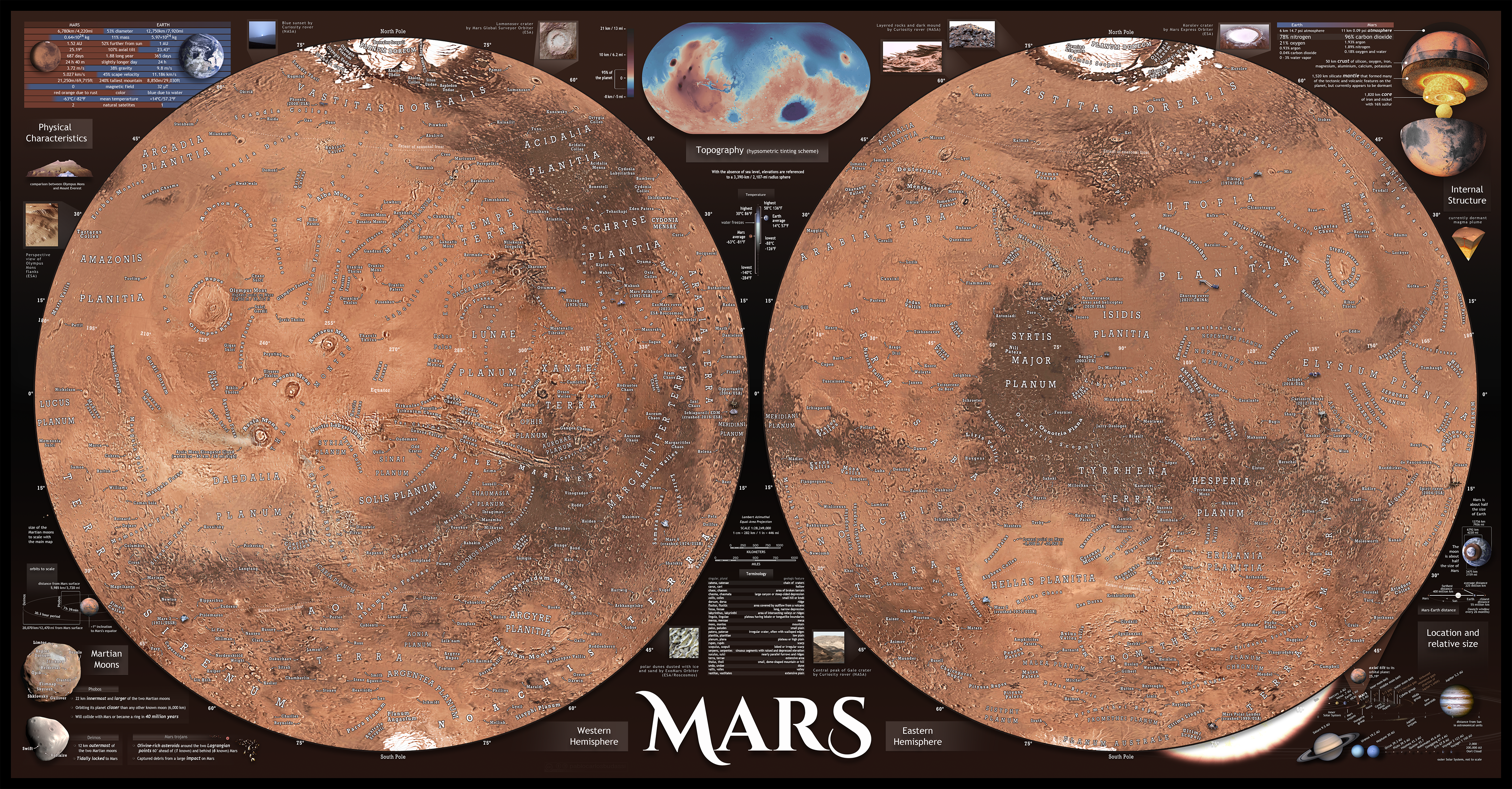
The surroundings of the Schiaparelli crater.

== In popular culture ==
In the 2011 novel The Martian by Andy Weir, and the 2015 feature film adapted from it, Schiaparelli is the landing site for Ares 4, the fourth crewed mission to Mars. The protagonist, Mark Watney, an astronaut from Ares 3 who is stranded on Mars, must travel from Acidalia Planitia to Schiaparelli, a journey of 3,200 kilometres (2,000 mi).

== See also ==
- 4062 Schiaparelli, asteroid
- Climate of Mars
- Geology of Mars
- HiRISE
- HiWish program
- Impact event
- List of craters on Mars
- Ore resources on Mars
- Planetary nomenclature
