= Ejecta blanket =

Layer of material thrown out of an impact crater

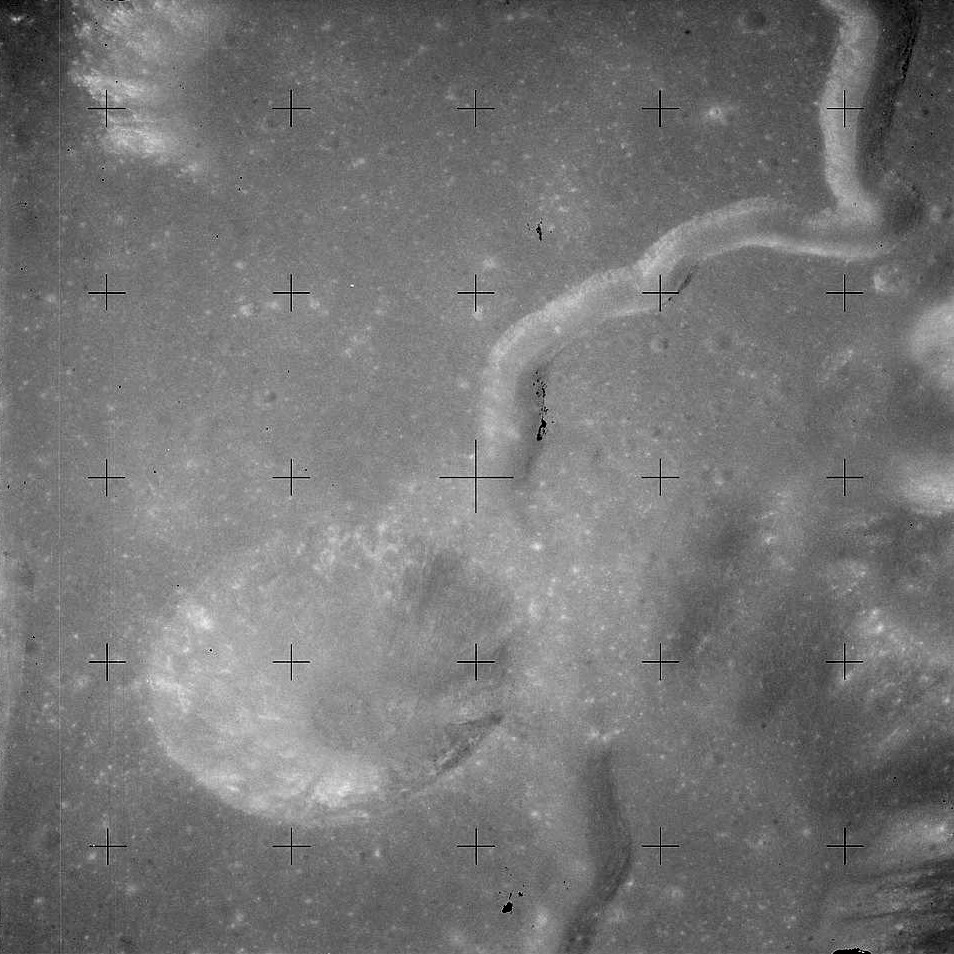
Ejecta blanket from Hadley C crater filling in Hadley Rille

An ejecta blanket is a generally symmetrical apron of ejecta that surrounds an impact crater; it is layered thickly at the crater's rim and thin to discontinuous at the blanket's outer edge. The impact cratering is one of the basic surface formation mechanisms of the solar system bodies (including the Earth) and the formation and emplacement of ejecta blankets are the fundamental characteristics associated with impact cratering event. The ejecta materials are considered as the transported materials beyond the transient cavity formed during impact cratering regardless of the state of the target materials.

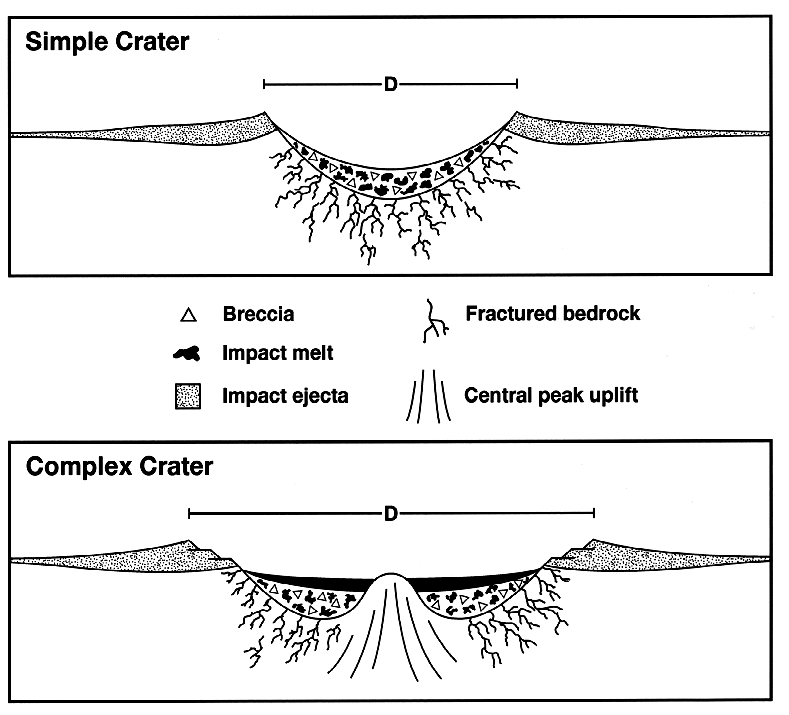
Structure of impact craters, showing surrounding ejecta

== Formation ==
A blanket of ejecta is formed during the formation of meteor impact cratering and is composed usually of the materials of that are ejected from the cratering process. Ejecta materials are deposited on the preexisting layer of target materials and therefore it form an inverted stratigraphy than the underlying bedrock. In some cases, the excavated fragment of ejects materials can form secondary craters. The materials of ejecta blanket come from rock fragments of crater excavation, materials due to impact melting, and outside the crater. Immediately after an impact event, the falling debris forms an ejecta blanket surrounding the crater. An ejecta blanket is deposited in the interior regions of the crater rim to the final crater rim and beyond the crater rim. Approximately half the volume of ejecta falls within 1 crater radius of the rim, or 2 radii from the center of the crater. The ejecta blanket becomes thinner with distance and increasingly discontinuous. Over 90% of the debris falls within approximately 5 radii of the center of the crater. Ejecta which falls within that area is considered proximal ejecta. Beyond 5 radii, the discontinuous debris is considered distal ejecta.

== Presence ==
Ejecta blankets are found on the terrestrial planets (e.g., Earth, Mars, and Mercury) and satellites (e.g., Moon). Many of the ejecta blankets of Mars are characterized by fluidized flowing across the surface. In contrast, the ejecta blankets and proximal ejecta deposits of Moon and Mercury (or on airless bodies) are attributed to ballistic sedimentation. Lunar fresh impact craters preserve continuous ejecta blanket that are characterized by blocky and high albedo materials. Similar to the fresh lunar craters, the Mercurian impact craters also form continuous ejecta deposits of blocky and high albedo materials. Radial structure of ejecta deposits are seen around the lunar impact crater and generally thins out as increase distance form the center of the crater. Presence of boulder materials are also seen in the lunar ejecta deposits. However, the diameter of boulder found in ejecta deposits are directly correlated with the size of impact crater diameter. The low gravity and lack of atmosphere (air less bodies) favors the formation of the impact cratering and associated ejecta black on the surface of Moon and Mercury. Although a thick atmosphere and relatively higher gravity of Venus reduce the likelihood impact cratering, the higher surface temperature augments the efficiency of the impact melting and associated ejecta deposits. Ejecta blanket is a common feature to be seen on the Martian impact craters specifically around fresh impact crater. One-third of the Martian impact craters with ≥ 5 km diameter have discernible impact ejecta around. Layered ejecta blanket are plentiful on the surface of Mars as around 90% of ejecta are characterized as layered materials. Though impact cratering and resulted ejecta blanket are ubiquitous features in the solid bodies of the Solar System, the Earth rarely preserve the signature of impact ejecta blanket due to erosion. However, to date, there are 190 identified impact craters on the surface of Earth.

== Morphology and types ==
Ejecta blankets have a diverse morphology. Variations in ejecta blanket indicates different geological characteristics involved with the impact cratering process such as nature of target materials and kinetic energy involved with the impact process. These information also give an idea about the planetary environment e.g., gravity and atmospheric effects associated with the impact cratering. Studying impact ejecta is an excellent sampling environment for the future in-situ lunar exploration. Ejecta blanket may not always evenly distributed around an impact crater. Based on the structure, ejecta blanket are described as rampart, lobate, butterfly, splosh, sinuous, etc. Many factors determine the extent of ejecta blanket that ranging from size and mass of impactor (meteorite, asteroid, or comet), surface temperature, gravity and atmospheric pressure of target body, the physical characteristics of target rock. The martian ejecta blankets are categorized broadly into three groups based on the observed morphology identified by spacecraft data:

a. Layer ejecta pattern: the ejecta blanket seems have formed by fluidization process and composed of single or multiple partial or complete layers of sheet of materials surrounding the crater. Sometime eolian modification are also common.

b. Radial ejecta blanket: the ejecta materials are emplaced by the secondary materials ejected along a ballistic trajectory. This radial patterns are also found around the lunar and Mercurian craters.

c. Combination of layered and radial ejecta pattern.

== See also ==
- Impact crater
- List of impact craters on Earth
- List of craters on Mercury
- List of craters on the Moon
- List of craters on Mars
- List of craters on Venus
