= Terra Sabaea =

Terra on Mars

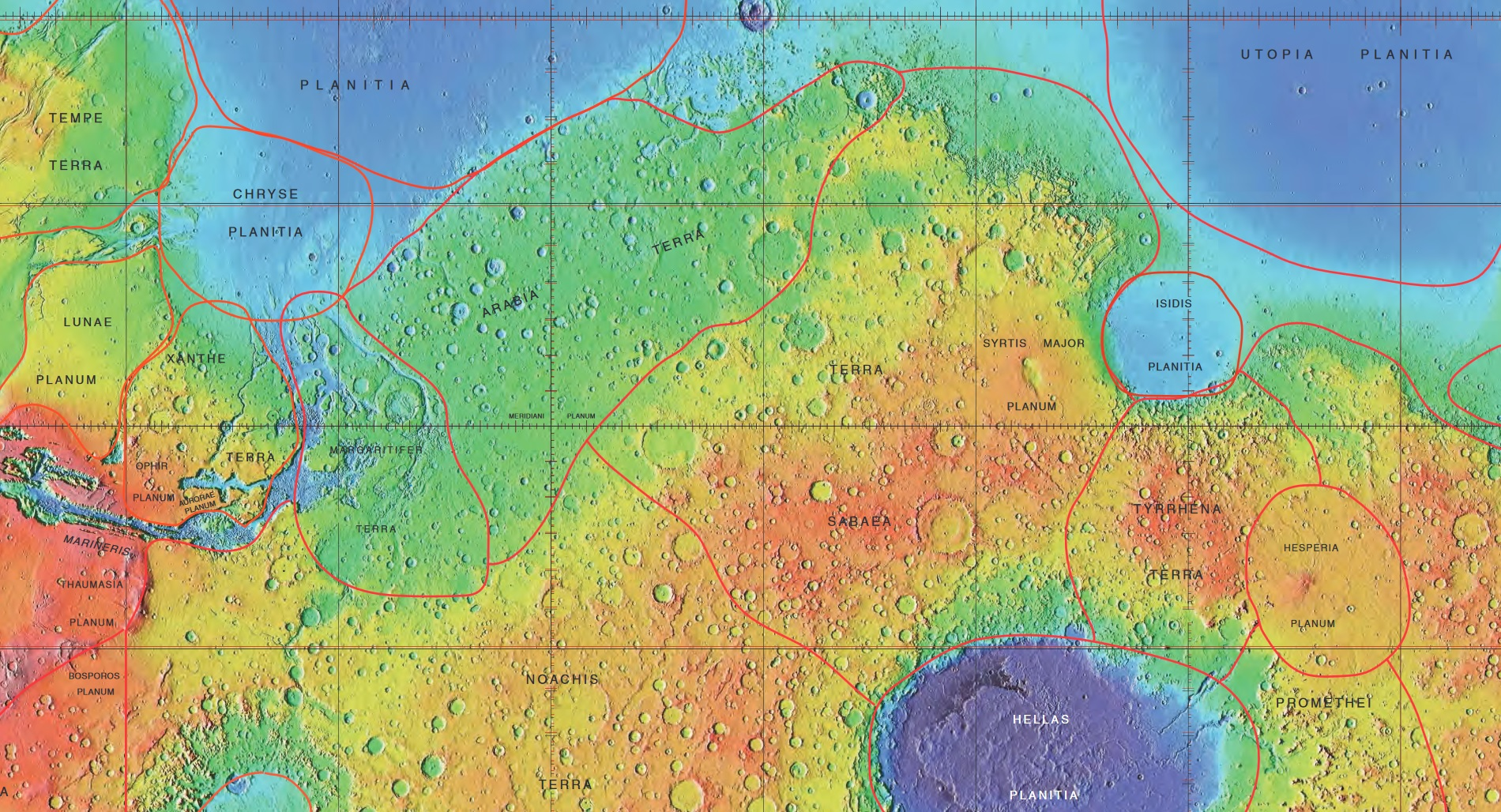
MOLA map showing boundaries of Terra Sabaea and other regions

Terra Sabaea is a large area on Mars. Its coordinates are 2°N 42°E and it covers 4,700 kilometres (2,900 mi) at its broadest extent. It was named in 1979 after a classic albedo feature on the planet. Terra Sabaea is fairly large and parts of it are found in five quadrangles: Arabia quadrangle, Syrtis Major quadrangle, Iapygia quadrangle, Ismenius Lacus quadrangle, and Sinus Sabaeus quadrangle.

== Glaciers ==
Some landscapes look just like glaciers moving out of mountain valleys on Earth. Some have a hollowed-out appearance, looking like a glacier after almost all the ice has disappeared. What is left are the moraines—the dirt and debris carried by the glacier. The center is hollowed out because the ice is mostly gone. These supposed alpine glaciers have been called glacier-like forms (GLF) or glacier-like flows (GLF). Glacier-like forms are a later and maybe more accurate term because we cannot be sure the structure is currently moving. Another, more general term sometimes seen in the literature is viscous flow features (VFF).

A variety of other features on the surface have also been interpreted as directly linked to flowing ice, such as fretted terrain, lineated valley fill, concentric crater fill, and arcuate ridges. A variety of surface textures seen in imagery of the midlatitudes and polar regions are also thought to be linked to sublimation of glacial ice.

The pictures below show features believed to be glaciers—some may still contain ice; in others the ice has probably largely disappeared. Since ice may be present under just a few meters of debris, these places could be used to supply future Martian settlers with water.

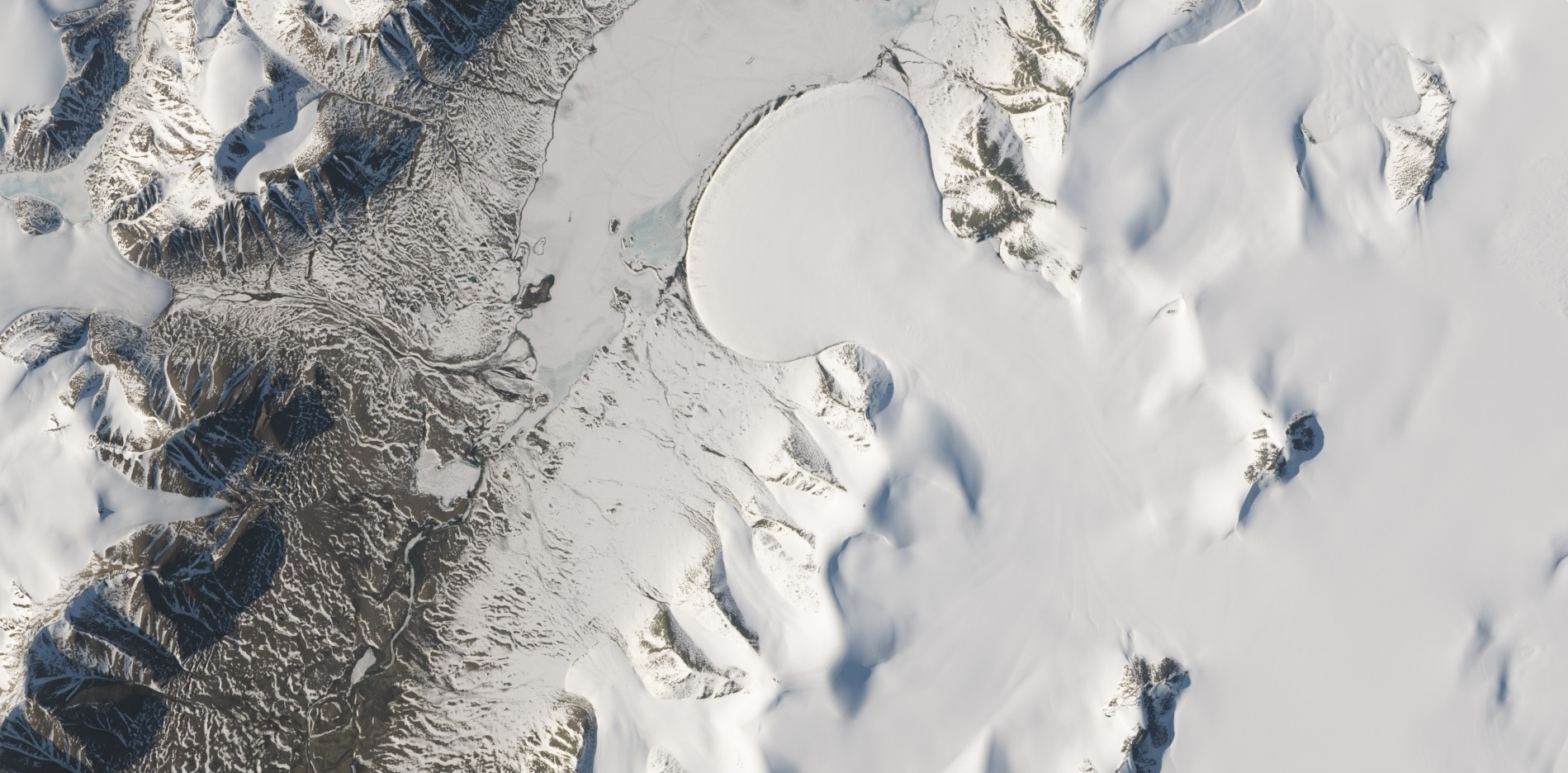
Romer Lake's Elephant Foot Glacier in the Earth's Arctic, as seen by Landsat 8. This picture shows several glaciers that have the same shape as many features on Mars that are believed to also be glaciers.

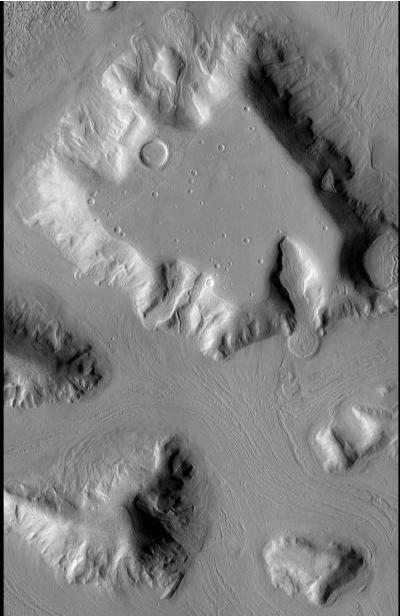
Mesa in Ismenius Lacus quadrangle, as seen by CTX. Mesa has several glaciers eroding it. One of the glaciers is seen in greater detail in the next two images from HiRISE.

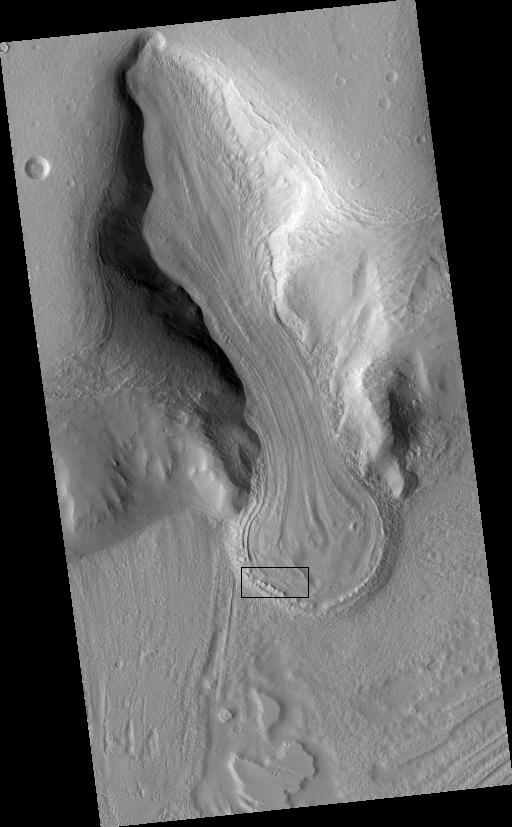
Glacier as seen by HiRISE under the HiWish program. Area in rectangle is enlarged in the next photo. Zone of accumulation of snow at the top. Glacier is moving down valley, then spreading out on plain. Evidence for flow comes from the many lines on surface. Location is in Protonilus Mensae in Ismenius Lacus quadrangle.

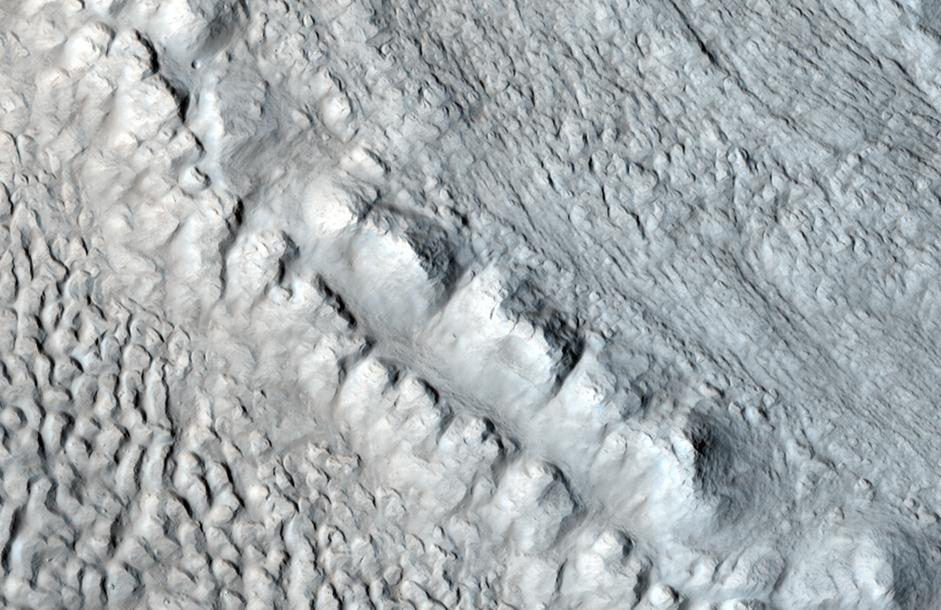
Enlargement of area in rectangle of the previous image. On Earth the ridge would be called the terminal moraine of an alpine glacier. Picture taken with HiRISE under the HiWish program.

== Dunes ==
When there are perfect conditions for producing sand dunes, steady wind in one direction and just enough sand, a barchan sand dune forms. Barchans have a gentle slope on the wind side and a much steeper slope on the lee side where horns or a notch often forms. The whole dune may appear to move with the wind. Observing dunes on Mars can tell us how strong the winds are, as well as their direction. If pictures are taken at regular intervals, one may see changes in the dunes or possibly in ripples on the dune’s surface. On Mars dunes are often dark in color because they were formed from the common, volcanic rock basalt. In the dry environment, dark minerals in basalt, like olivine and pyroxene, do not break down as they do on Earth. Although rare, some dark sand is found on Hawaii which also has many volcanoes discharging basalt. Barchan is a Russian term because this type of dune was first seen in the desert regions of Turkistan. Some of the wind on Mars is created when the dry ice at the poles is heated in the spring. At that time, the solid carbon dioxide (dry ice) sublimates or changes directly to a gas and rushes away at high speeds. Each Martian year 30% of the carbon dioxide in the atmosphere freezes out and covers the pole that is experiencing winter, so there is a great potential for strong winds. Some places in Terra Sabaea show dunes, as in the images below.

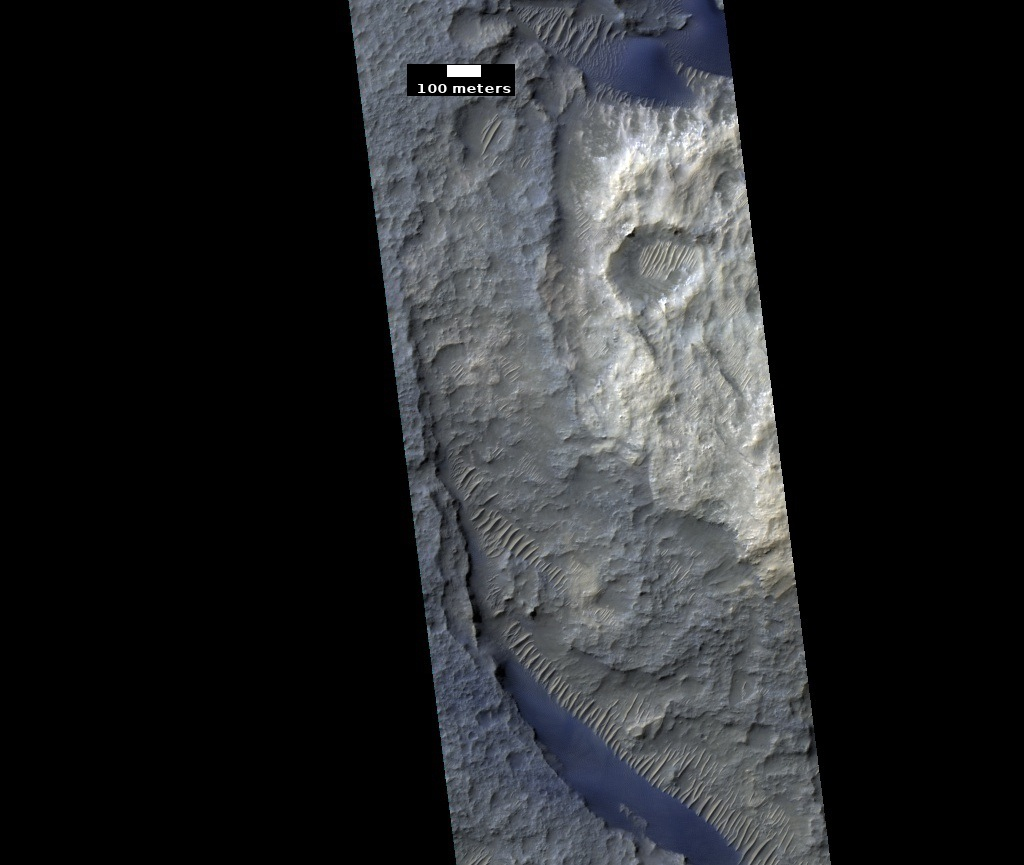
Dunes in Schaeberle (Martian crater), as seen by HiRISE under the HiWish program.

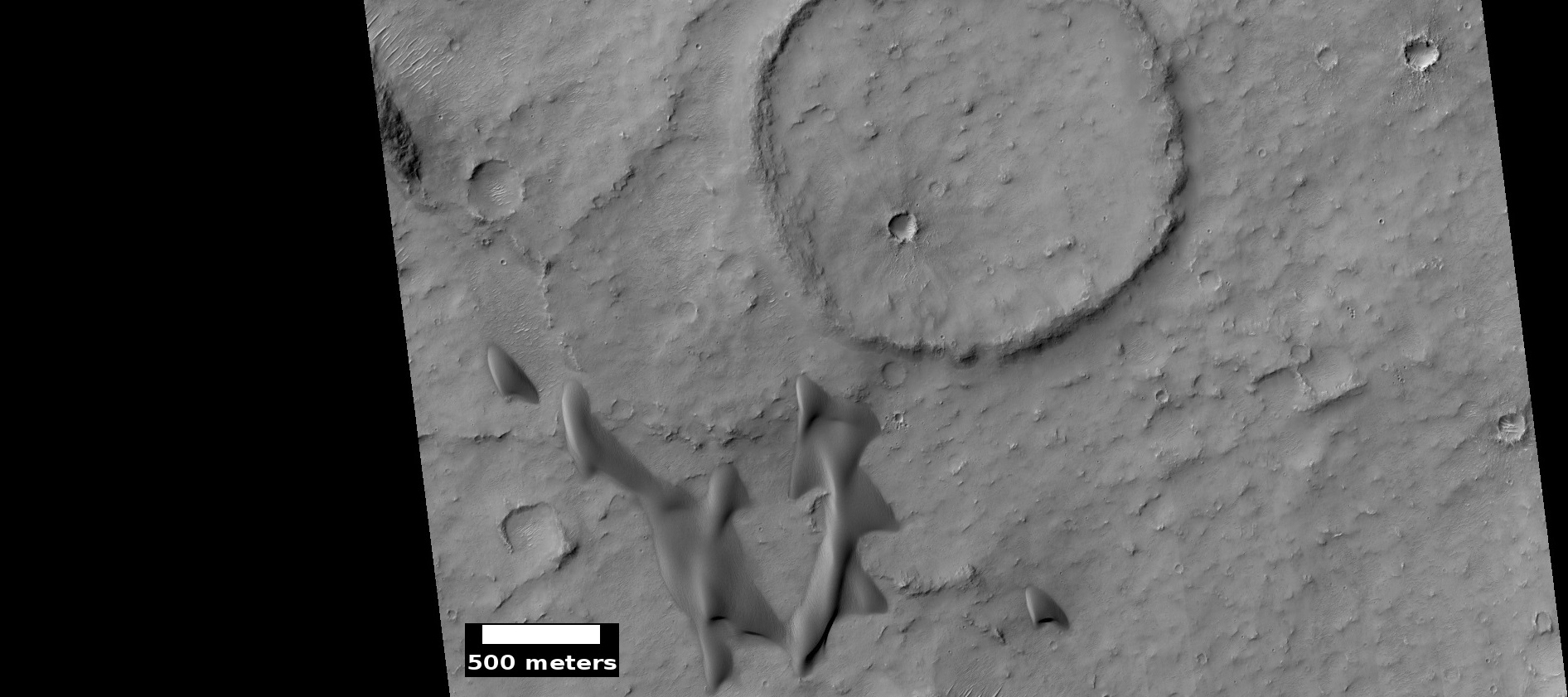
Dunes and craters, as seen by HiRISE under HiWish program Some of the dunes are barchans.

== Concentric crater fill ==
A concentric crater fill is a landform where the floor of a crater is mostly covered with a large number of parallel ridges. It is common in the mid-latitudes of Mars, and is widely believed to be caused by glacial movement.

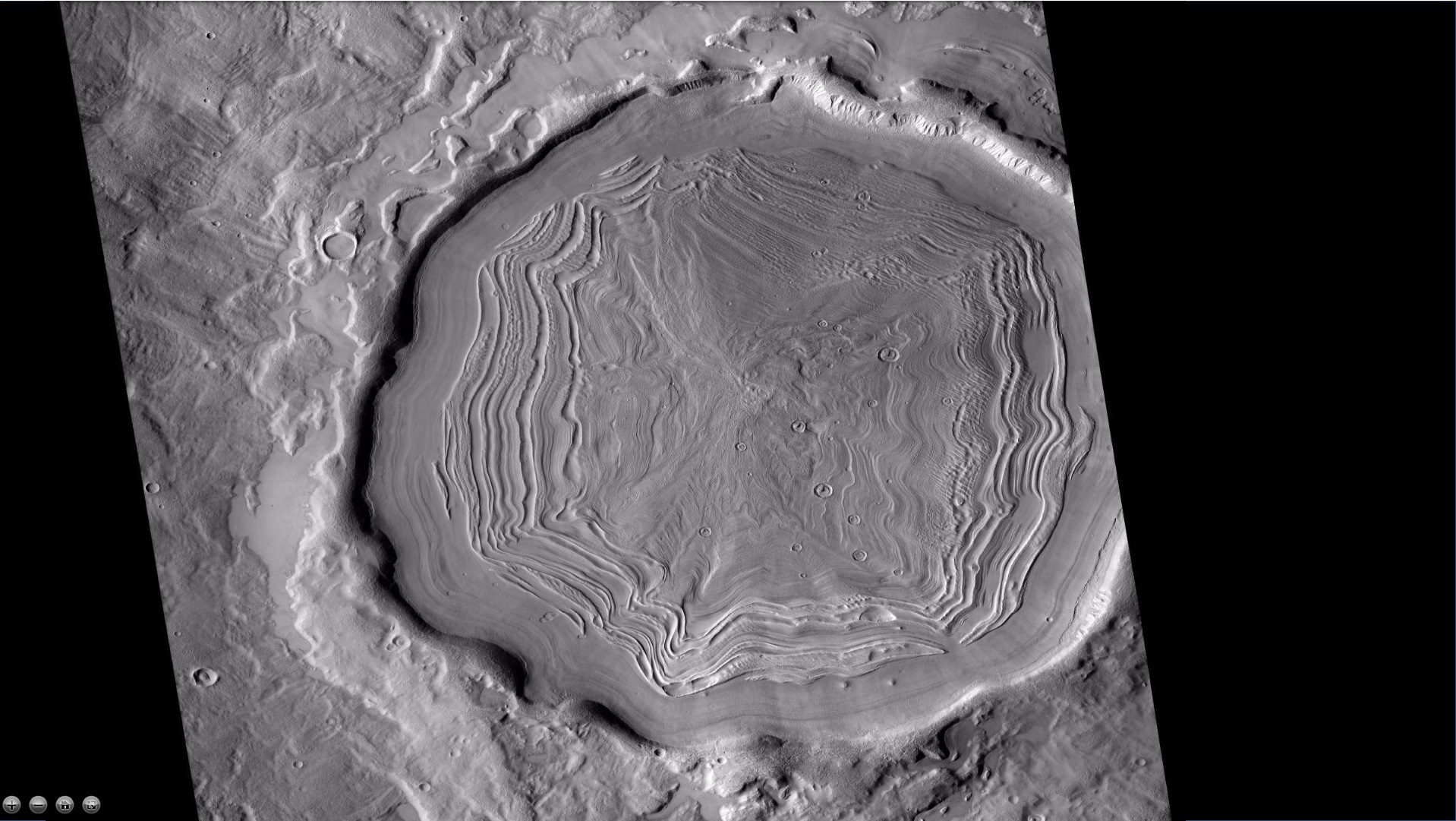
Crater with concentric crater fill, as seen by CTX (on Mars Reconnaissance Orbiter). Location is Casius quadrangle.

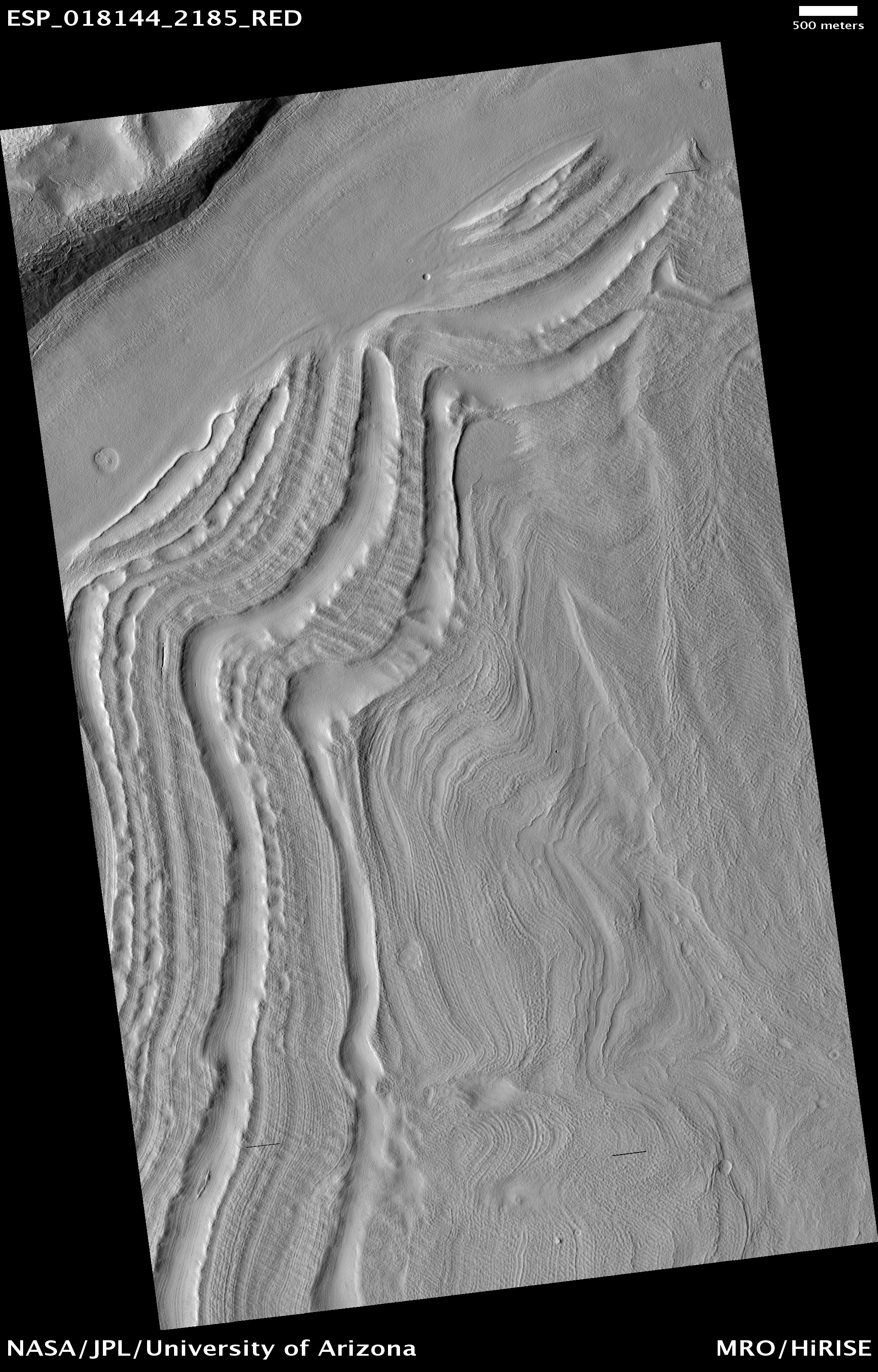
Well-developed hollows of concentric crater fill, as seen by HiRISE under the HiWish program.

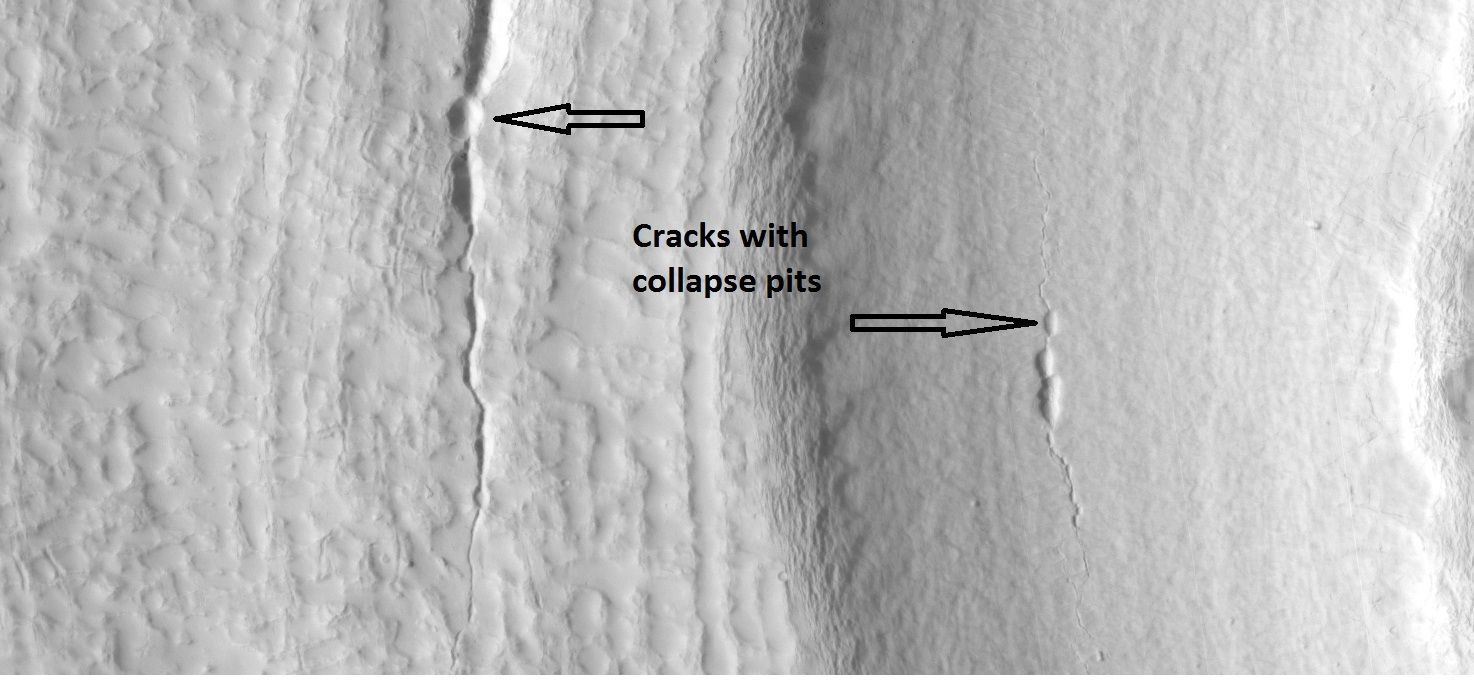
Close-up that shows cracks containing pits on the floor of a crater containing concentric crater fill, as seen by HiRISE under HiWish program.

== Layers in craters ==
Layers along slopes, especially along crater walls are believed to be the remains of a once wide spread material that has mostly been eroded away.

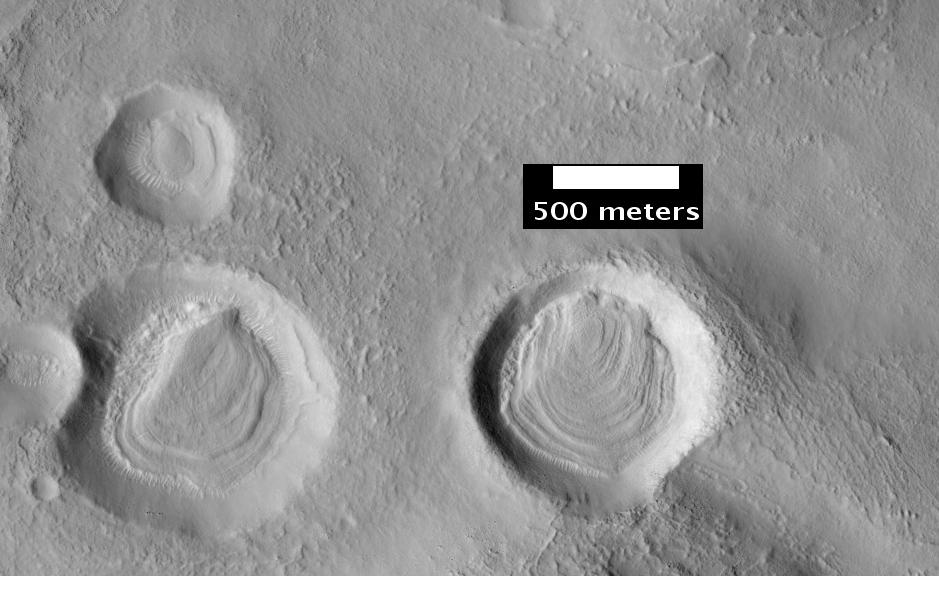
Layers in craters, as seen by HiRISE under the HiWish program. Area was probably covered over by these layers; the layers have now eroded away except for the protected interior of craters.

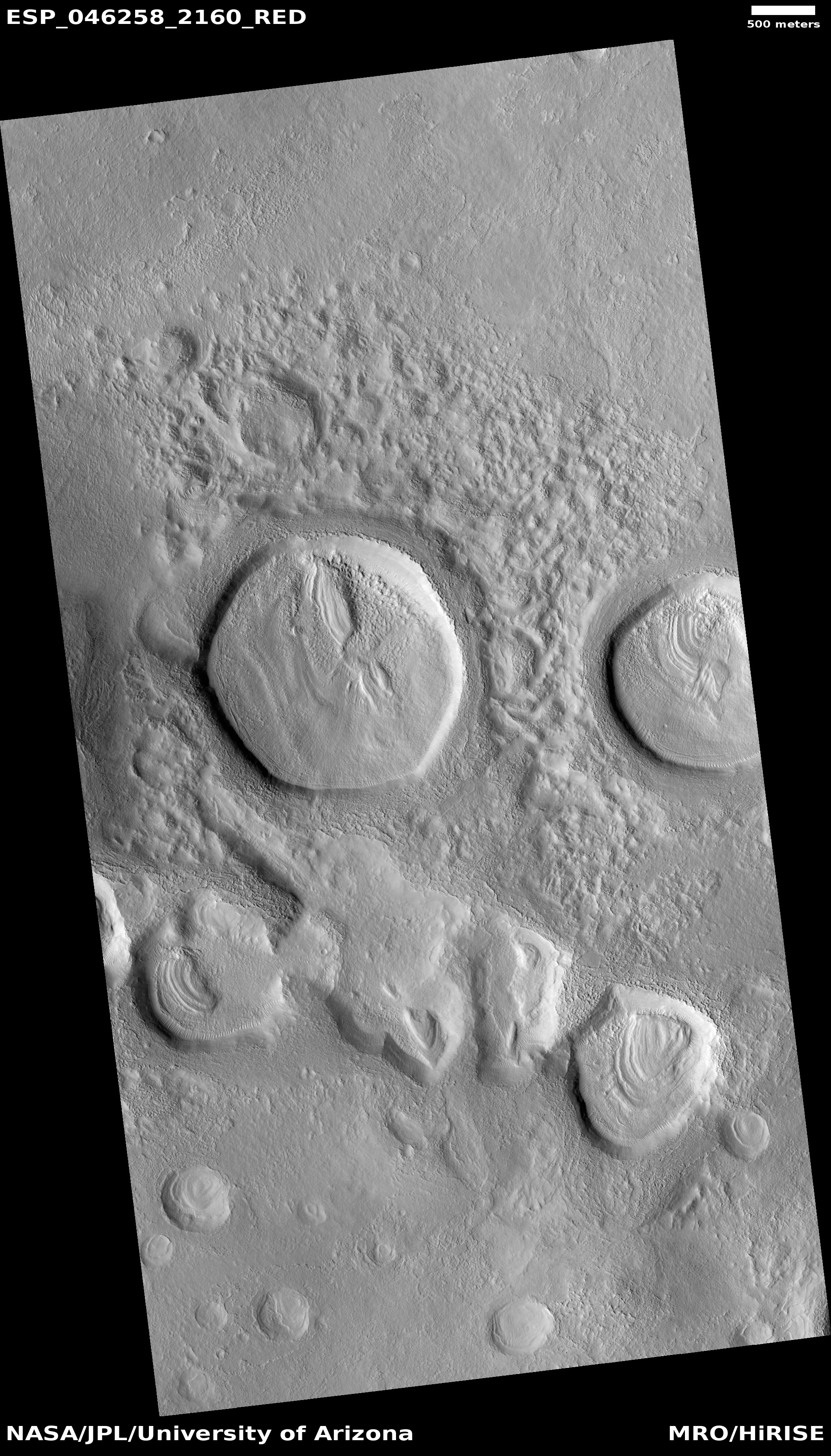
Layers in craters, as seen by HiRISE under HiWish program

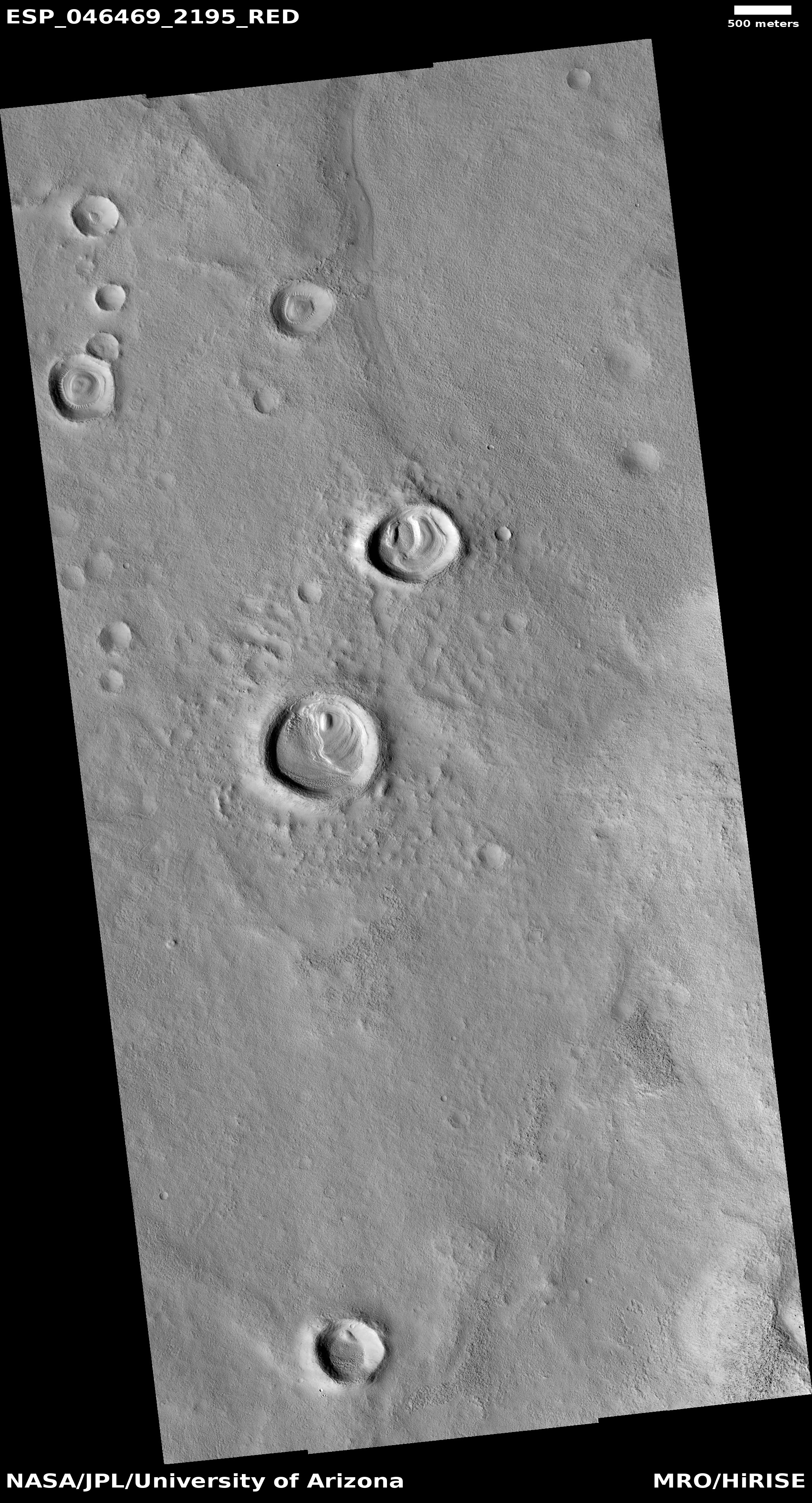
Layers in craters, as seen by HiRISE under HiWish program

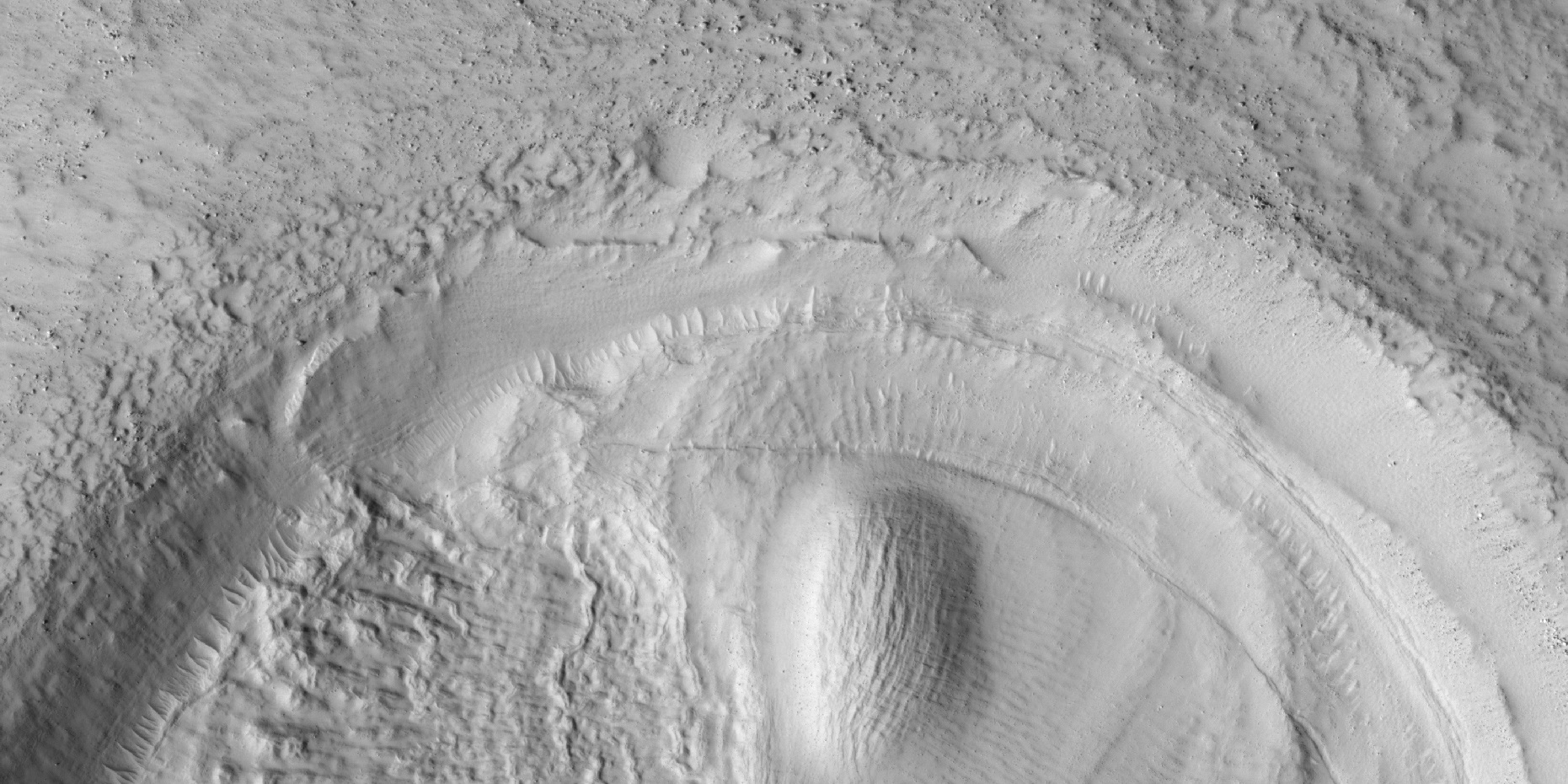
Close view of layers in craters, as seen by HiRISE under HiWish program Note: this is an enlargement of the previous image.

== Layers ==
Many places on Mars show rocks arranged in layers. Rock can form layers in a variety of ways. Volcanoes, wind, or water can produce layers. Groundwater may have been involved in the formation of layers in some places.

,

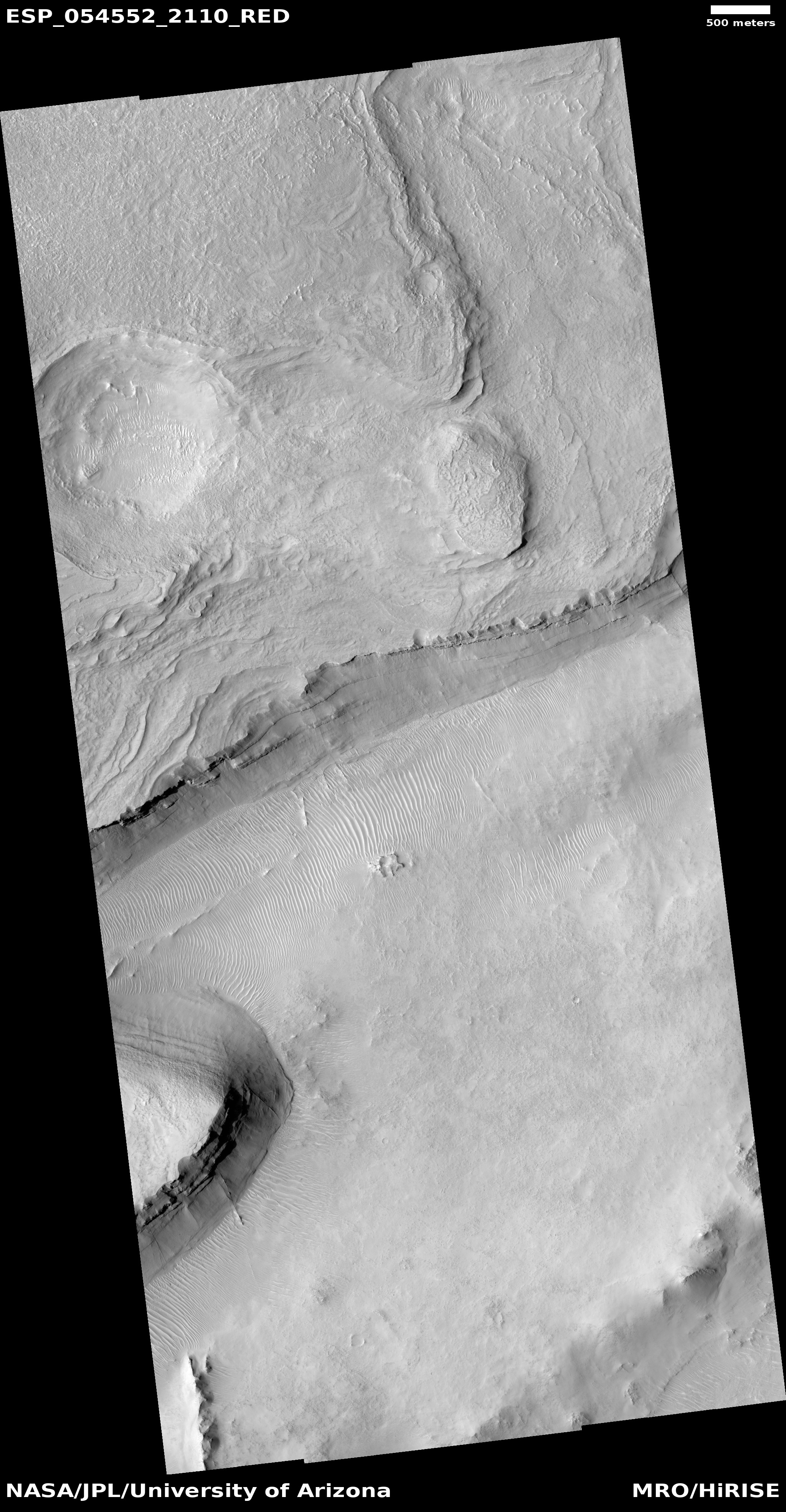
Wide view of layers, as seen by HiRISE under HiWish program

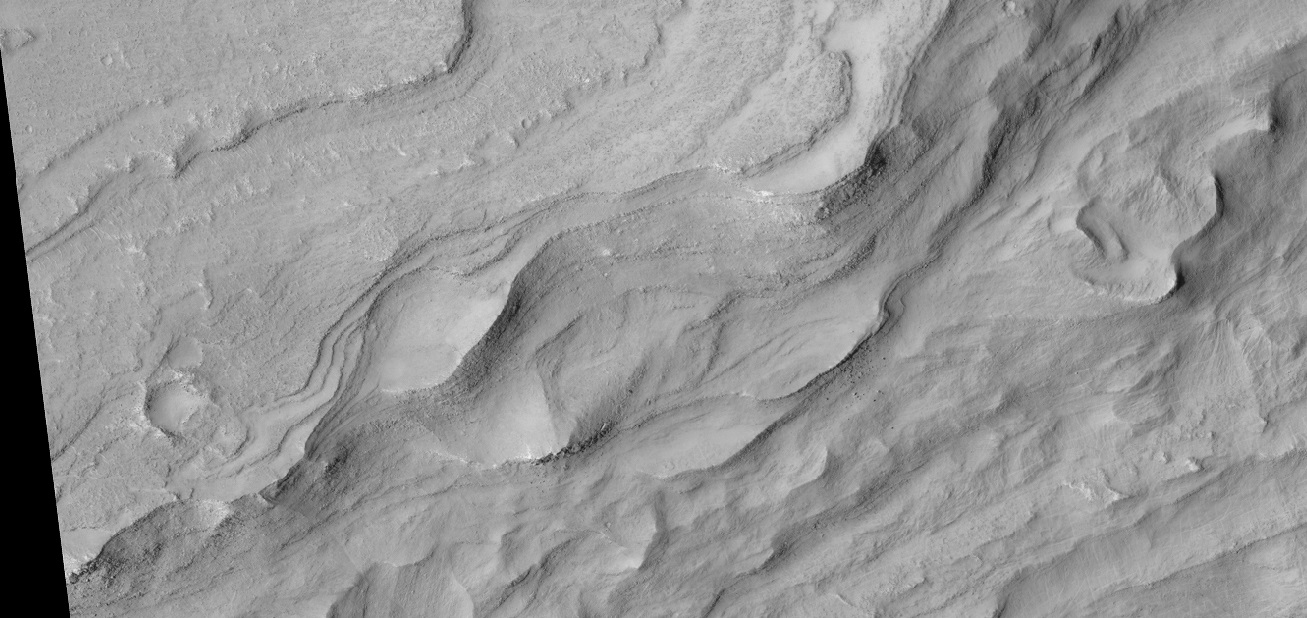
Close view of layers, as seen by HiRISE under HiWish program

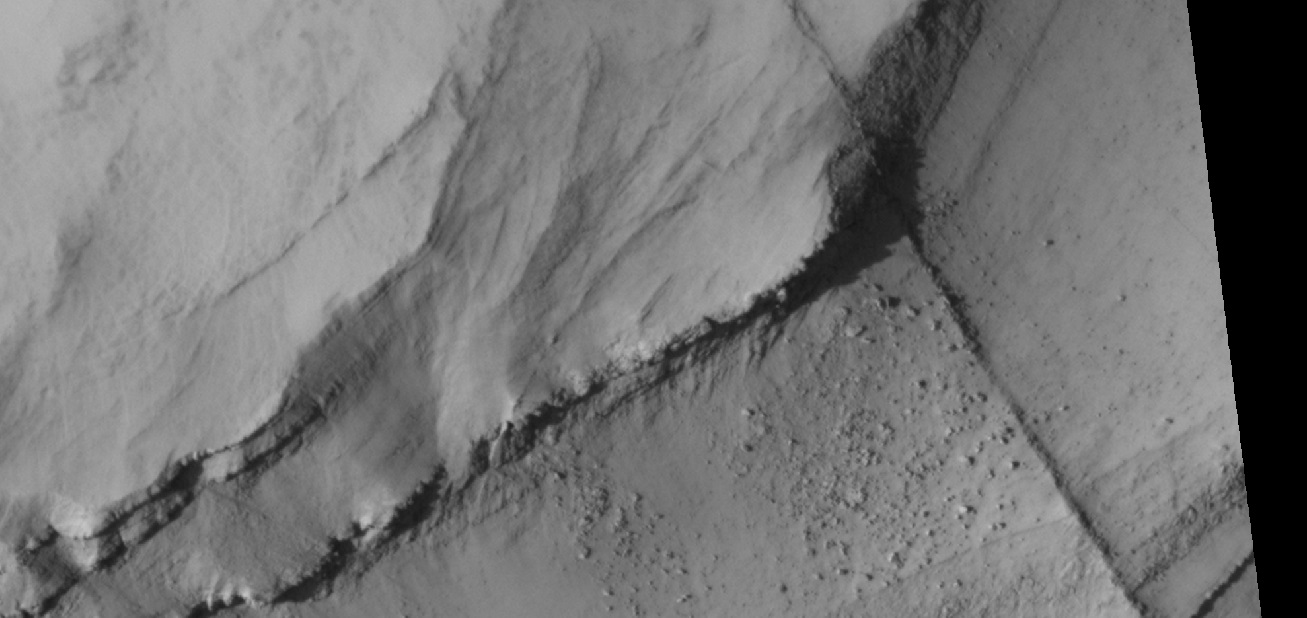
Close view of layers, as seen by HiRISE under HiWish program A ridge cuts across the layers at a right angle.

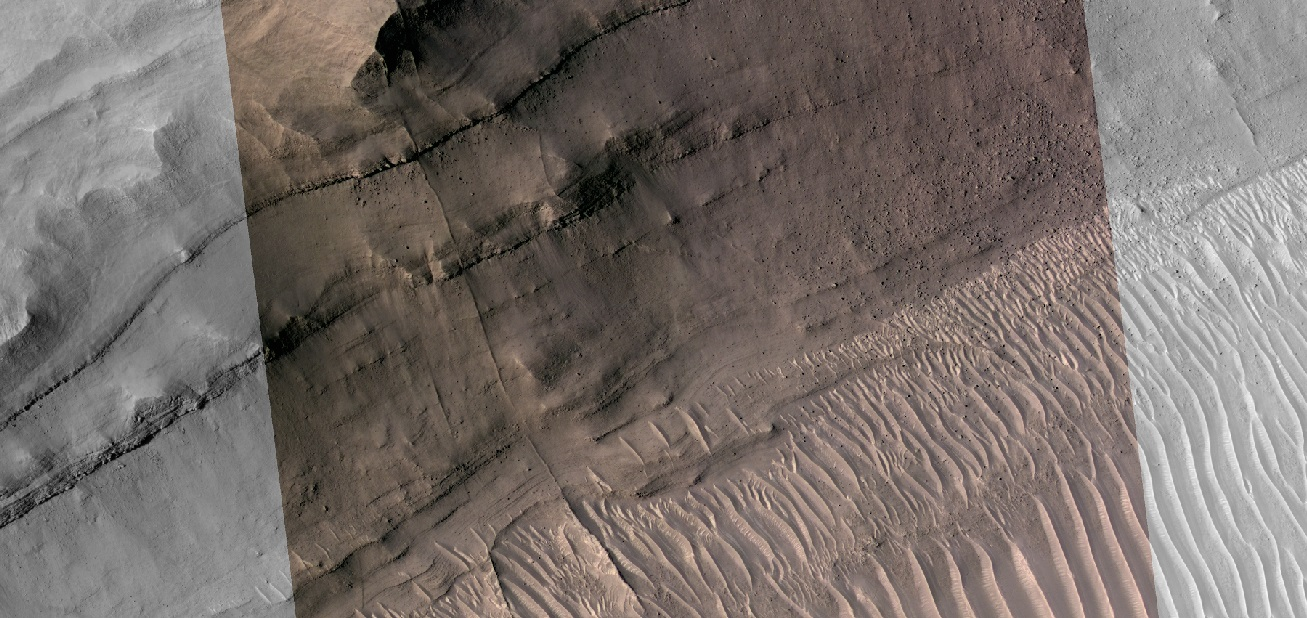
Close view of layers, as seen by HiRISE under HiWish program Part of picture is in color. A ridge cuts across the layers at a right angle.

== Linear Ridge Networks ==
Linear ridge networks are found in various places on Mars in and around craters. Ridges often appear as mostly straight segments that intersect in a lattice-like manner. They are hundreds of meters long, tens of meters high, and several meters wide. It is thought that impacts created fractures in the surface, these fractures later acted as channels for fluids. Fluids cemented the structures. With the passage of time, surrounding material was eroded away, thereby leaving hard ridges behind. Since the ridges occur in locations with clay, these formations could serve as a marker for clay which requires water for its formation.

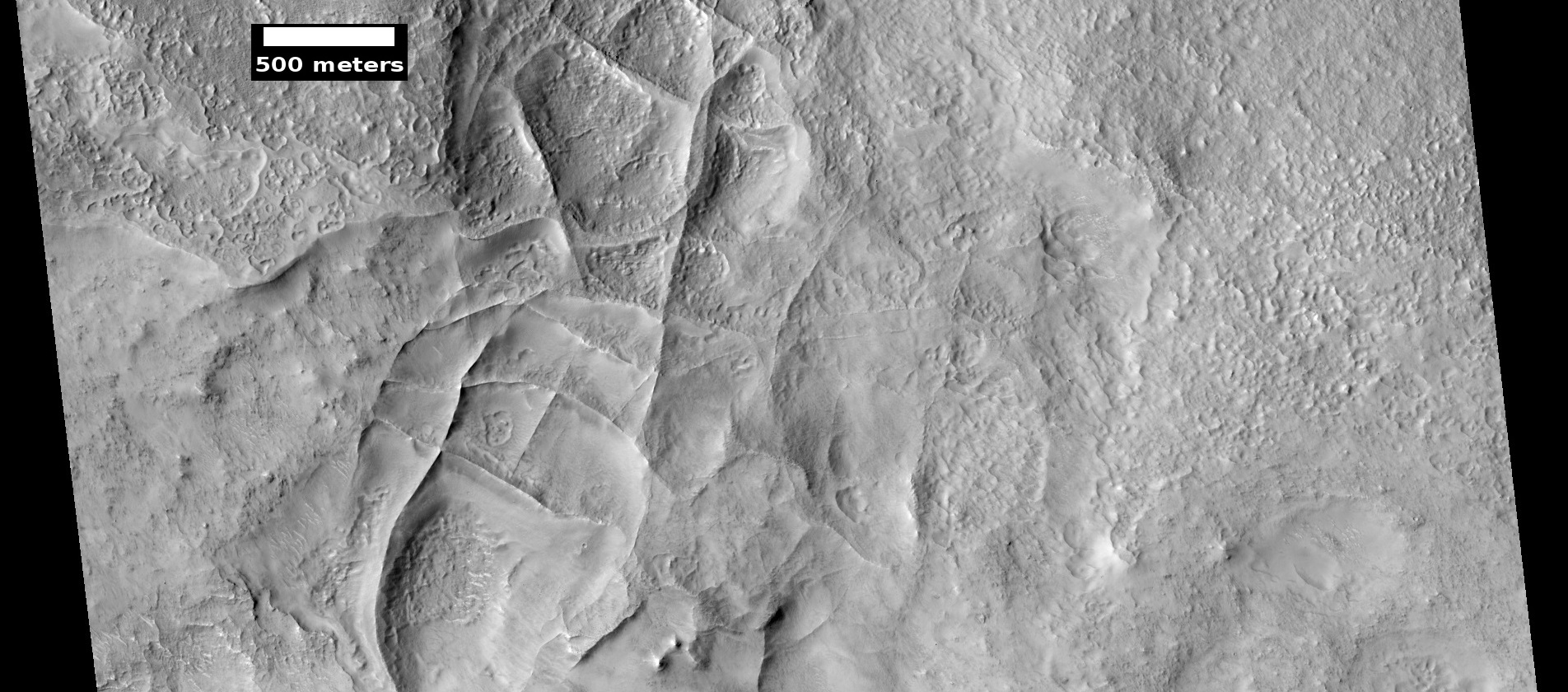
Network of ridges, as seen by HiRISE under HiWish program Ridges may be formed in various ways.

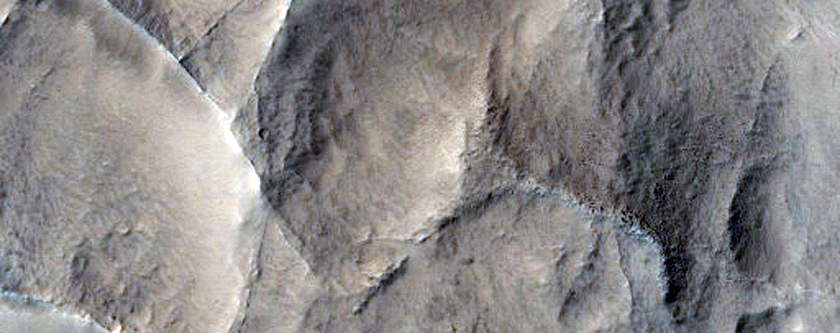
Color, close-up of ridges seen in previous image, as seen by HiRISE under HiWish program

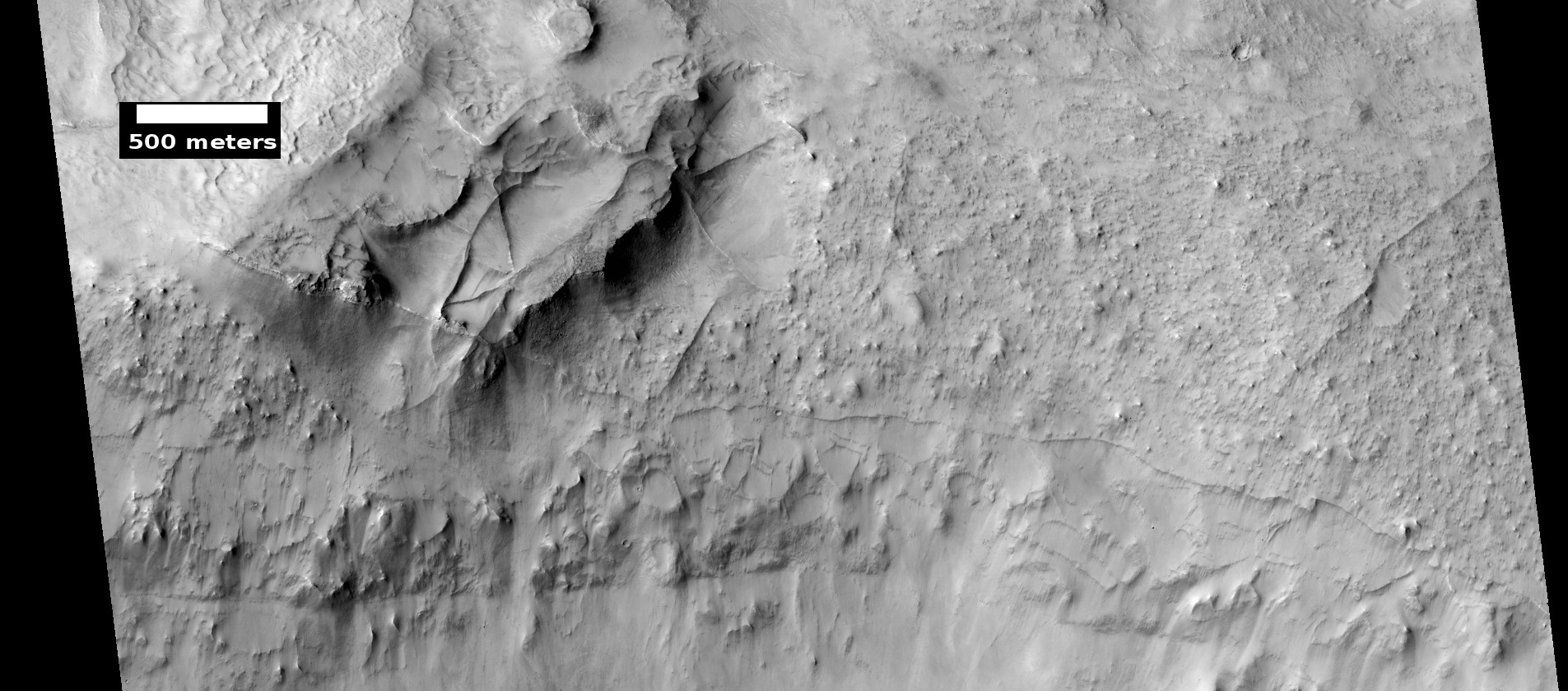
More ridges from the same place as the previous two images, as seen by HiRISE under HiWish program

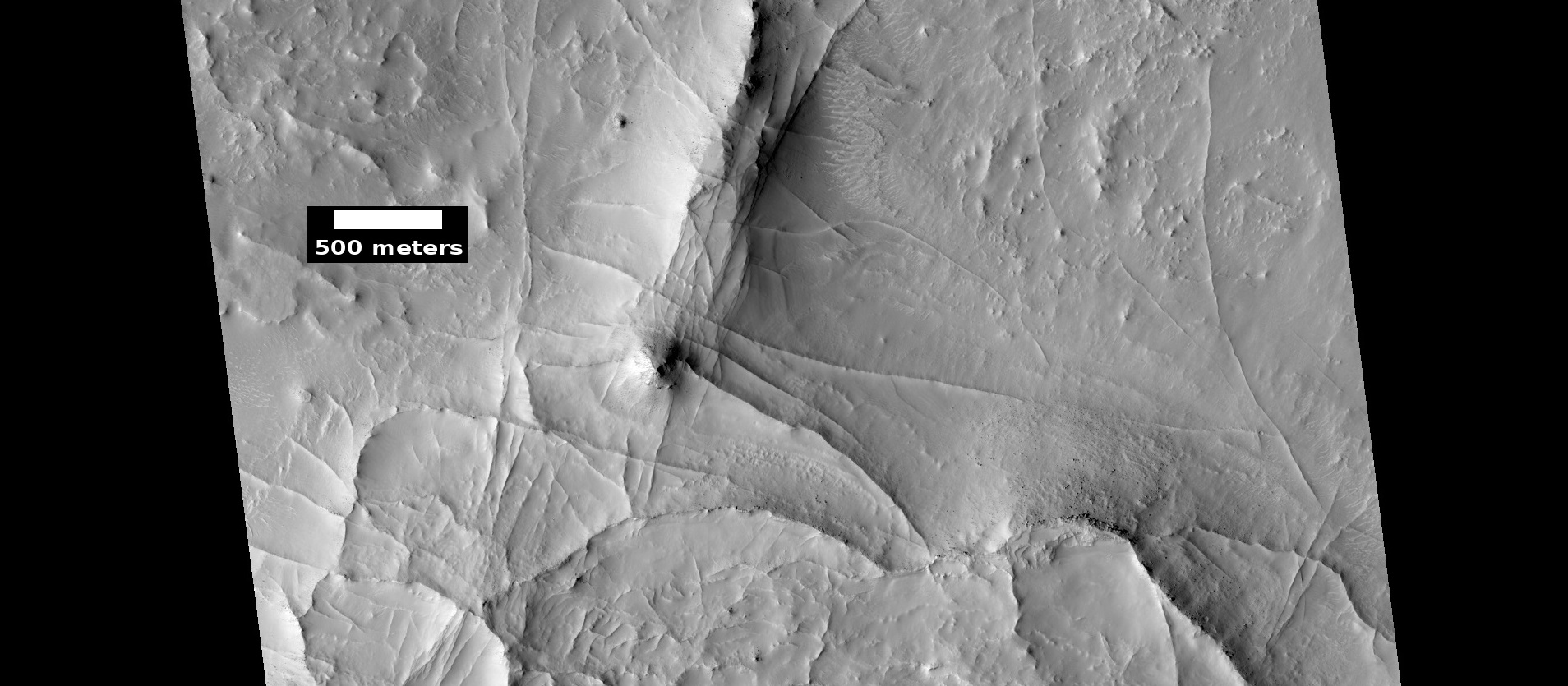
Linear ridge network, as seen by HiRISE under HiWish program

== See also ==
- Barchan
- Glacier
- Glaciers on Mars
- Groundwater on Mars
- List of terrae on Mars

== Recommended reading ==
- Grotzinger, J. and R. Milliken (eds.). 2012. Sedimentary Geology of Mars. SEPM.
- Lorenz, R. 2014. The Dune Whisperers. The Planetary Report: 34, 1, 8-14
- Lorenz, R., J. Zimbelman. 2014. Dune Worlds: How Windblown Sand Shapes Planetary Landscapes. Springer Praxis Books / Geophysical Sciences.
