= List of quadrangles on Mars =

Geographic subunits of the surface of Mars

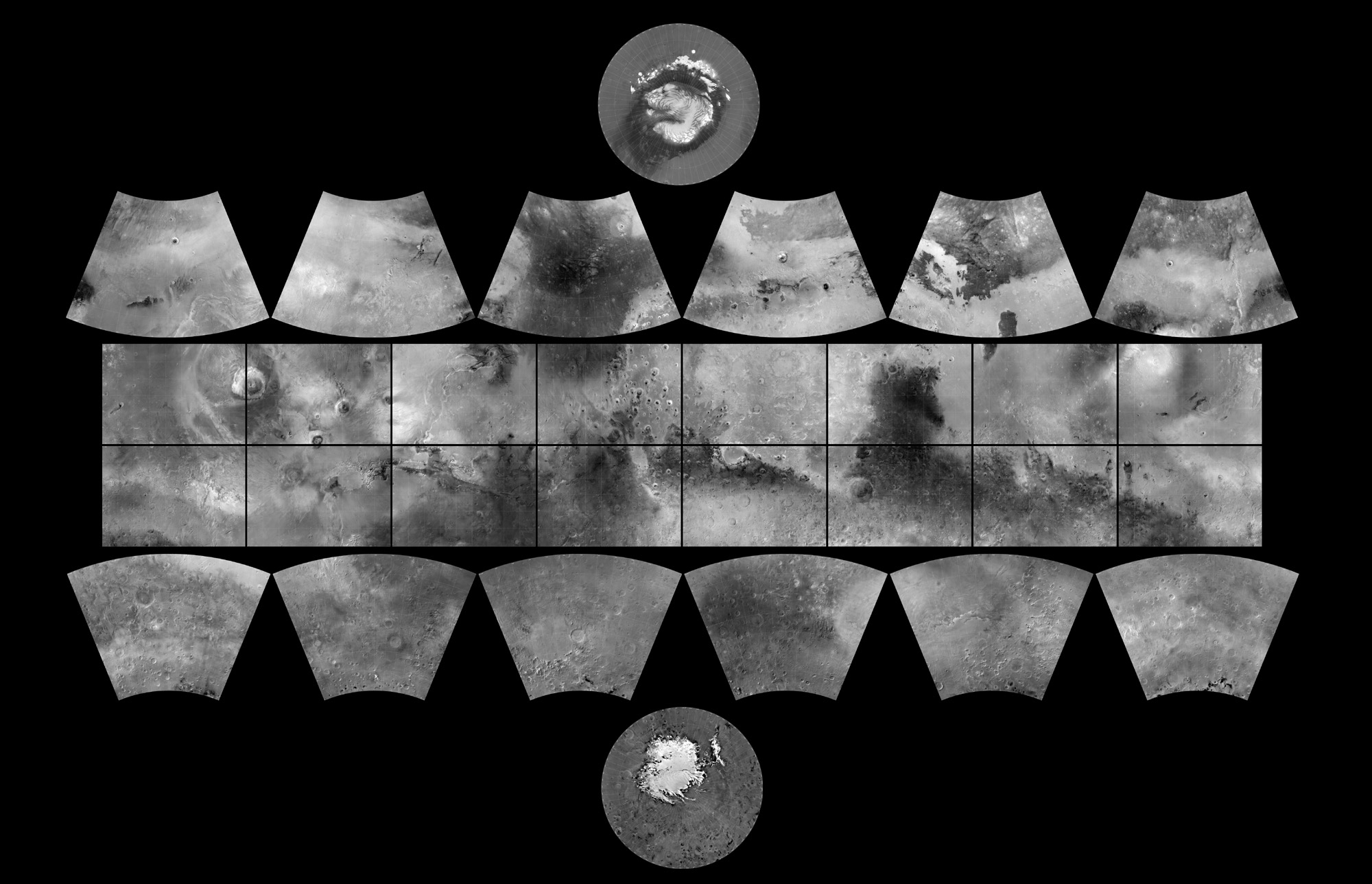
Map of Mars showing the 30 quadrangles.

The surface of Mars has been divided into thirty cartographic quadrangles by the United States Geological Survey. Each quadrangle is a region covering a specified range of latitudes and longitudes on the Martian surface. The quadrangles are named after classical albedo features, and they are numbered from one to thirty with the prefix "MC" (for "Mars Chart"), with the numbering running from north to south and from west to east.

The quadrangles appear as rectangles on maps based on a cylindrical map projection, but their actual shapes on the curved surface of Mars are more complicated Saccheri quadrilaterals. The sixteen equatorial quadrangles are the smallest, with surface areas of 4,500,000 square kilometres (1,700,000 sq mi) each, while the twelve mid-latitude quadrangles each cover 4,900,000 square kilometres (1,900,000 sq mi). The two polar quadrangles are the largest, with surface areas of 6,800,000 square kilometres (2,600,000 sq mi) each.

== History ==
In 1972, NASA's Mariner 9 mission returned thousands of photographs collectively covering more than 80% of the Martian surface. That year and the next, NASA's Jet Propulsion Laboratory collaborated with the United States Geological Survey's Astrogeology Research Program to assemble Mariner's photographs into the first detailed photomosaic maps of Mars. To organize and subdivide this work, the USGS divided the planet's surface into thirty cartographic quadrangles, each named for classical albedo features within the respective regions, and the various quadrangles were assigned to geologists at USGS and at American universities for mapping and study.

As continuing missions to Mars have made increasingly accurate maps available, the International Astronomical Union has assigned names to regions of the planet's surface that reflect its actual surface features and geology. These names are also broadly inspired by classical albedo features, with the result that they generally correspond to the names of the arbitrary USGS quadrangles, though larger IAU features frequently span multiple quadrangles.

== Quadrangles ==
The maps below were produced by the Mars Global Surveyor's Mars Orbiter Laser Altimeter; redder colors indicate higher elevations. The maps of the equatorial quadrangles use a Mercator projection, while those of the mid-latitude quadrangles use a Lambert conformal conic projection, and the maps of the polar quadrangles use a polar stereographic projection.

Number	Name	Latitudes	Longitudes	Features	Map
MC-01	Mare Boreum	65–90° N	180° W – 180° E	Features	Topographical map of Mare Boreum quadrangle
MC-02	Diacria	30–65° N	120–180° W	Features	Topographical map of Diacria quadrangle
MC-03	Arcadia	30–65° N	60–120° W	Features	Topographical map of Arcadia quadrangle
MC-04	Mare Acidalium	30–65° N	0–60° W	Features	Topographical map of Mare Acidalium quadrangle
MC-05	Ismenius Lacus	30–65° N	0–60° E	Features	Topographical map of Ismenius Lacus quadrangle
MC-06	Casius	30–65° N	60–120° E	Features	Topographical map of Casius quadrangle
MC-07	Cebrenia	30–65° N	120–180° E	Features	Topographical map of Cebrenia quadrangle
MC-08	Amazonis	0–30° N	135–180° W	Features	Topographical map of Amazonis quadrangle
MC-09	Tharsis	0–30° N	90–135° W	Features	Topographical map of Tharsis quadrangle
MC-10	Lunae Palus	0–30° N	45–90° W	Features	Topographical map of Lunae Palus quadrangle
MC-11	Oxia Palus	0–30° N	0–45° W	Features	Topographical map of Oxia Palus quadrangle
MC-12	Arabia	0–30° N	0–45° E	Features	Topographical map of Arabia quadrangle
MC-13	Syrtis Major	0–30° N	45–90° E	Features	Topographical map of Syrtis Major quadrangle
MC-14	Amenthes	0–30° N	90–135° E	Features	Topographical map of Amenthes quadrangle
MC-15	Elysium	0–30° N	135–180° E	Features	Topographical map of Elysium quadrangle
MC-16	Memnonia	0–30° S	135–180° W	Features	Topographical map of Memnonia quadrangle
MC-17	Phoenicis Lacus	0–30° S	90–135° W	Features	Topographical map of Phoenicis Lacus quadrangle
MC-18	Coprates	0–30° S	45–90° W	Features	Topographical map of Coprates quadrangle
MC-19	Margaritifer Sinus	0–30° S	0–45° W	Features	Topographical map of Margaritifer Sinus quadrangle
MC-20	Sinus Sabaeus	0–30° S	0–45° E	Features	Topographical map of Sinus Sabaeus quadrangle
MC-21	Iapygia	0–30° S	45–90° E	Features	Topographical map of Iapygia quadrangle
MC-22	Mare Tyrrhenum	0–30° S	90–135° E	Features	Topographical map of Mare Tyrrhenum quadrangle
MC-23	Aeolis	0–30° S	135–180° E	Features	Topographical map of Aeolis quadrangle
MC-24	Phaethontis	30–65° S	120–180° W	Features	Topographical map of Phaethontis quadrangle
MC-25	Thaumasia	30–65° S	60–120° W	Features	Topographical map of Thaumasia quadrangle
MC-26	Argyre	30–65° S	0–60° W	Features	Topographical map of Argyre quadrangle
MC-27	Noachis	30–65° S	0–60° E	Features	Topographical map of Noachis quadrangle
MC-28	Hellas	30–65° S	60–120° E	Features	Topographical map of Hellas quadrangle
MC-29	Eridania	30–65° S	120–180° E	Features	Topographical map of Eridania quadrangle
MC-30	Mare Australe	65–90° S	180° W – 180° E	Features	Topographical map of Mare Australe quadrangle

== See also ==
- List of quadrangles on Mercury
- List of quadrangles on Venus
- List of quadrangles on the Moon

MC-01 Mare Boreum (features)
MC-02 Diacria (features)		MC-03 Arcadia (features)	MC-04 Acidalium (features)	MC-05 Ismenius Lacus (features)		MC-06 Casius (features)	MC-07 Cebrenia (features)
MC-08 Amazonis (features)	MC-09 Tharsis (features)	MC-10 Lunae Palus (features)	MC-11 Oxia Palus (features)	MC-12 Arabia (features)	MC-13 Syrtis Major (features)	MC-14 Amenthes (features)	MC-15 Elysium (features)
MC-16 Memnonia (features)	MC-17 Phoenicis Lacus (features)	MC-18 Coprates (features)	MC-19 Margaritifer Sinus (features)	MC-20 Sinus Sabaeus (features)	MC-21 Iapygia (features)	MC-22 Mare Tyrrhenum (features)	MC-23 Aeolis (features)
MC-24 Phaethontis (features)		MC-25 Thaumasia (features)	MC-26 Argyre (features)	MC-27 Noachis (features)		MC-28 Hellas (features)	MC-29 Eridania (features)
MC-30 Mare Australe (features)
