= List of craters on Mars: A–G =

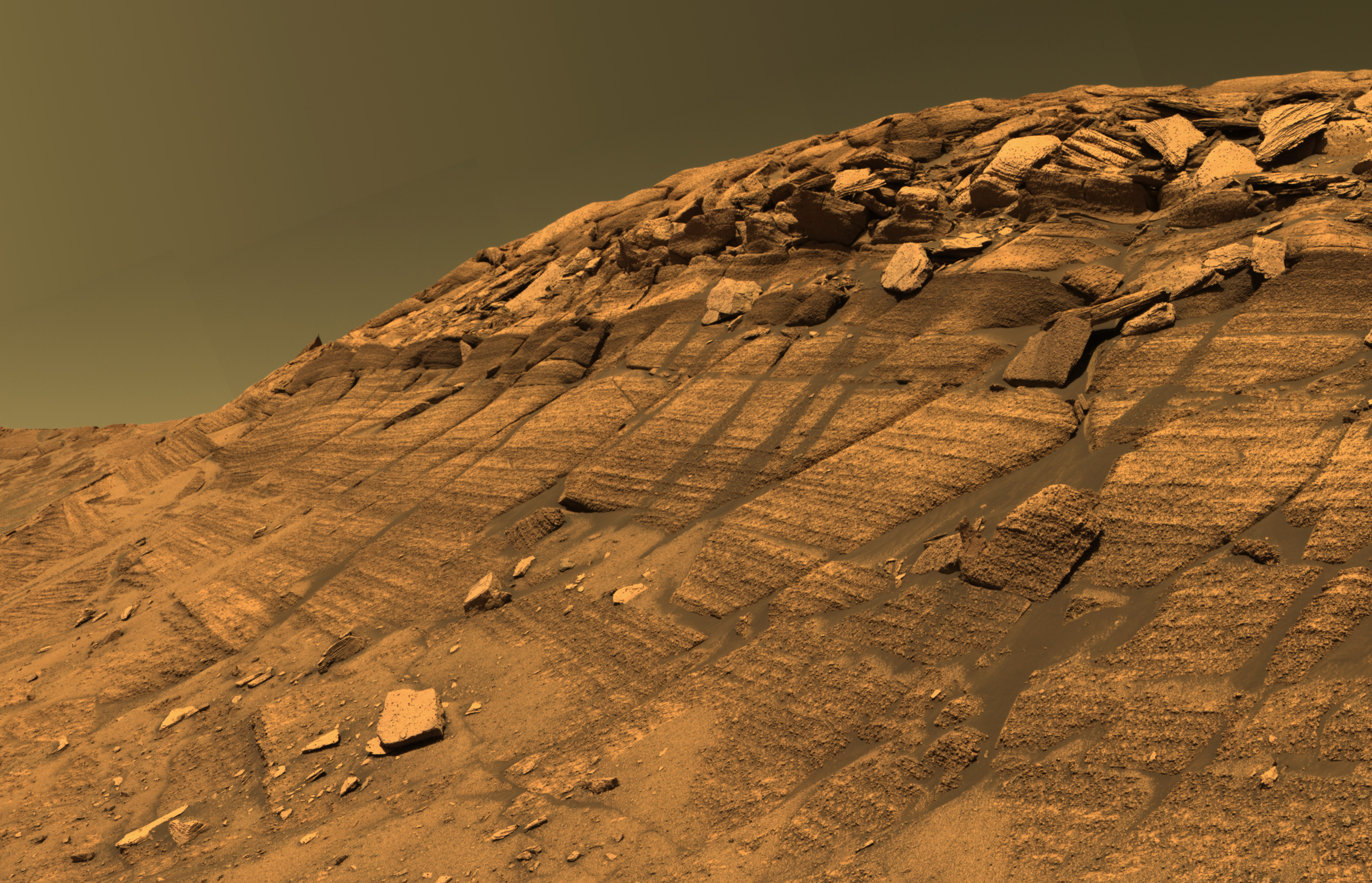
Opportunity rover images Burns Cliff inside Endurance impact crater in 2004.

This is a partial list of craters on Mars. There are hundreds of thousands of impact craters on Mars, but only some of them have names. This list here only contains named Martian craters starting with the letter A – G (see also lists for H – N and O – Z).

Large Martian craters (greater than 60 kilometers in diameter) are named after famous scientists and science fiction authors; smaller ones (less than 60 km in diameter) get their names from towns on Earth. Craters cannot be named for living people, and small crater names are not intended to be commemorative – that is, a small crater isn't actually named after a specific town on Earth, but rather its name comes at random from a pool of terrestrial place names, with some exceptions made for craters near landing sites. Latitude and longitude are given as planetographic coordinates with west longitude.

== A ==
Crater	Coordinates	Diameter (km)	Approval date	Named after	Ref
Aarna	14.7°N 338.43°E	43	2022	India place name	WGPSN
Aban	16.1°N 249.0°W	4.2	1988	Aban, Russia	WGPSN
Abu	15.5°N 337.22°E	17	2022	India place name	WGPSN
Achar	45.8°N 236.9°W	5.5	1979	Uruguay place name	WGPSN
Ada	3.0°S 3.2°W	1.0	2006	USA (Oklahoma) place name	WGPSN
Adams	31.1°N 197.0°W	94.9	1973	Walter Sydney Adams	WGPSN
Agassiz	70.1°S 89.0°W	117.7	1973	Louis Agassiz	WGPSN
Airy	5.1°S 0.1°E	41.0	1973	George Biddell Airy	WGPSN
Airy-0	5.1°S -0.0°E	0.5	1973	George Biddell Airy	WGPSN
Ajon	16.7°N 256.9°W	8.4	1988	Ayon, Russia	WGPSN
Aki	35.8°S 60.3°W	8.1	1979	Japan place name	WGPSN
Aktaj	20.6°N 46.6°W	4.9	1988	Russia place name	WGPSN
Alamos	23.48°N 37.21°W	6.3	2006	Mexico place name	WGPSN
Albany	23.2°N 49.1°W	2.0	1979	Albany, NY, USA	WGPSN
Albi	41.8°S 35.1°W	8.5	1976	France place name	WGPSN
Alexey Tolstoy	47.8°S 234.8°W	95.0	1982	Aleksei Tolstoi	WGPSN
Alga	24.6°S 26.7°W	19.2	1976	Kazakhstan place name	WGPSN
Alitus	35.2°S 38.2°W	50.0	1979	Alytus, Lithuania	WGPSN
Alnif	15.14°S 328.91°E	23.99	2017	Town in Morocco	WGPSN
Alofi	9.84°N 359.98°E	43	2018	Alofi, Niue	WGPSN
Amed	4.37°N 77.83°E	30	2022	Amed, Indonesia	WGPSN
Amsterdam	23.2°N 47.1°W	1.3	1979	Amsterdam, Netherlands	WGPSN
Andapa	5.33°S 355.27°E	11	2017	Town in Madagascar	WGPSN
Angelica	18.65°N 76.95°E	3.5	2020	Town in New York, USA	WGPSN
Angu	20.2°N 254.4°W	1.8	1988	Dem. Rep. Congo place name	WGPSN
Aniak	32.2°S 69.6°W	51.0	1979	Aniak, Alaska, USA	WGPSN
Annapolis	23.4°N 47.8°W	0.4	1979	Annapolis, MD, USA	WGPSN
Antoniadi	21.5°N 299.2°W	394.0	1973	E. M. Antoniadi	WGPSN
Apia	37.6°S 271.1°W	10.5	1991	Samoa place name	WGPSN
Apt	40.2°N 9.6°W	10.0	1976	France place name	WGPSN
Arago	10.2°N 330.2°W	154.0	1973	François Arago	WGPSN
Arandas	42.7°N 15.1°W	25.1	1976	Arandas, Mexico	WGPSN
Argas	23.6°N 50.3°W	3.7	1988	Argas, Russia	WGPSN
Arica	24.0°S 249.9°W	15.5	1991	Colombia place name	WGPSN
Arima	15.8°S 296.3°E	53.6	2012	Town in Trinidad and Tobago	WGPSN
Arkhangelsky	41.4°S 24.8°W	125.0	1979	Andrey Arkhangelsky	WGPSN
Arrhenius	40.3°S 237.4°W	129.0	1973	Svante Arrhenius	WGPSN
Arta	21.6°N 54.4°W	4.0	1988	Arta, Russia	WGPSN
Artik	34.8°S 131.0°E	5.4	2013	Artik, Armenia	WGPSN
Arvi	39.34°S 202.72°E	7	2022	Arvi, India	WGPSN
Asau	3.6°S 154.7°E	25.0	2013	Town in Tuvalu	WGPSN
Asimov	47.0°S 355.05°W	85.0	2009	Isaac Asimov	WGPSN
Aspen	21.6°S 23.2°W	20.3	1976	Aspen, Colorado	WGPSN
Auce	27.2°S 279.9°W	37.0	2014	Auce, Latvia	WGPSN
Auki	15.8°S 263.1°W	40	2015	Auki, Solomon Islands	WGPSN
Avan	11°S 290.2°W	3.3	2016	Avan, village in Armenia	WGPSN
Avarua	35.9°S 250.43°W	52.0	2010	Cook Islands place name	WGPSN
Aveiro	21.5°N 79.1°W	9.5	1985	Portugal place name	WGPSN
Avire	40.83°S 159.9°W	6.54	2008	Vanuatu place name	WGPSN
Ayacucho	38.5°N 92.2°W	2.5	1991	Bolivia place name	WGPSN
Ayr	39.3°S 268.5°W	13.0	1991	Australia (Queensland) place name	WGPSN
Azul	42.4°S 42.6°W	19.7	1976	Argentina place name	WGPSN
Azusa	5.6°S 40.4°W	41.1	1976	USA (California) place name	WGPSN

back to top

== B ==
Crater	Coordinates	Diameter (km)	Date approved	Named after	Ref
Babakin	36.4°S 71.6°W	78.0	1985	Georgy Babakin	WGPSN
Babati	3.16°S 137.93°W	22.0	2025	Town in Tanzania	WGPSN
Bacht	18.9°N 257.4°W	8.0	1976	Baxt, Uzbekistan place name	WGPSN
Bacolor	33.0°N 241.4°W	20.8	2006	Bacolor, Philippines	WGPSN
Bada	20.5°N 50.8°W	2.1	1988	Russia place name	WGPSN
Badger	46.58°N 194.85°E	0.734	(informal)	England place name	—
Badwater	22.8°S 297.9°W	33.1	2015	USA (California) place name, the lowest point in North America.	WGPSN
Bahn	3.5°S 43.4°W	12.3	1976	Liberia place name	WGPSN
Bak	18.3°N 256.3°W	3.2	1988	Hungary place name	WGPSN
Bakhuysen	23.3°S 344.4°W	161.0	1973	Hendricus van de Sande Bakhuyzen	WGPSN
Balboa	3.9°S 34.0°W	23.3	1976	Panama place name	WGPSN
Baldet	23.0°N 294.6°W	180.0	1973	Fernand Baldet	WGPSN
Balta	24.1°S 26.6°W	18.2	1976	Ukraine place name	WGPSN
Baltisk	42.7°S 54.7°W	52.0	1976	Baltiysk, Russia	WGPSN
Balvicar	16.4°N 53.3°W	20.5	1988	Scotland place name	WGPSN
Bam	25.8°S 244.3°W	6.8	2017	Bam, Iran	WGPSN
Bamba	3.4°S 41.7°W	23.0	1976	Dem. Rep. Congo place name	WGPSN
Bamberg	40.0°N 3.2°W	58.3	1976	Bamberg, Germany	WGPSN
Banes	10.76°N 355.68°W	41	2018	Banes, Cuba	WGPSN
Banff	17.7°N 30.8°W	5.0	1976	Canada (Alberta) place name	WGPSN
Banh	19.6°N 55.6°W	15.0	1976	Burkina Faso place name	WGPSN
Bar	25.5°S 19.5°W	1.9	1976	Ukraine place name	WGPSN
Barabashov	47.7°N 68.8°W	125.6	1973	Nikolai P. Barabashov	WGPSN
Barlow	11.65°S 270.09°W	87.0	2024	Nadine G. Barlow	WGPSN
Barnard	61.4°S 298.4°W	125.0	1973	Edward Emerson Barnard	WGPSN
Baro	25.0°S 249.4°W	16.7	1991	Nigeria place name	WGPSN
Barsukov	8.0°N 29.1°W	71.7	2003	Valeri Barsukov	WGPSN
Barth	7.44°N 25.67°W	111	2019	Charles A., American atmospheric physicist (1930–2014)	WGPSN
Basin	18.0°N 253.1°W	15.7	1976	Basin, Wyoming	WGPSN
Batoka	7.7°S 36.8°W	15.5	1976	Zambia place name	WGPSN
Batoş	21.7°N 29.5°W	17.2	1976	Romania place name	WGPSN
Batson	28.91°S 84.15°E	75	2018	Raymond Milner, American geologist and photogrammetrist	WGPSN
Baucau	28.4°N 55.1°W	17.9	2012	Timor-Leste place name	WGPSN
Baum		62	2016	William Alvin; American astronomer (1924–2012)	WGPSN
Baykonyr	46.7°N 227.4°W	4.0	1979	Kazakhstan place name	WGPSN
Bazas	28.0°S 266.7°W	16.7	1991	France place name	WGPSN
Beagle	2.0°S 5.5°W	0.04	(informal)	HMS Beagle	—
Becquerel	22.3°N 8.0°W	171.2	1973	Henri Becquerel	WGPSN
Beer	14.6°S 8.2°W	89.8	1973	Wilhelm Beer	WGPSN
Beloha	39.5°S 303.4°W	33.5	2006	Madagascar place name	WGPSN
Beltra	18.2°N 257.7°W	7.4	1988	Ireland place name	WGPSN
Belva	18.48°N 77.38°E	0.9	2020	Belva, West Virginia	WGPSN
Belyov		0.2	2013	(Belev) Town in Tula region, Russia.	WGPSN
Belz	21.8°N 43.3°W	10.2	1976	Belz, Ukraine	WGPSN
Bend	22.6°S 27.8°W	3.6	1976	Bend, Oregon	WGPSN
Bentham	56.1°S 40.6°W	11.5	1991	England place name	WGPSN
Bentong	22.5°S 19.1°W	10.2	1976	Malaysia place name	WGPSN
Bernard	23.6°S 154.3°W	131.0	1985	P. Bernard	WGPSN
Berseba	4.5°S 37.7°W	37.5	1976	Namibia place name	WGPSN
Beruri	5.28°N 278.84°W	46.6	2006	Brazil place name	WGPSN
Betio	23.1°S 78.7°W	32.4	2013	Kiribati place name	WGPSN
Bhor	42.1°N 225.6°W	6.0	1979	Bhor, India place name	WGPSN
Bianchini	64.2°S 95.4°W	76.0	1973	Francesco Bianchini	WGPSN
Bigbee	25.0°S 34.8°W	20.5	1976	USA (Mississippi) place name	WGPSN
Bira	25.4°N 45.6°W	2.9	1988	Russia place name	WGPSN
Bise	20.4°N 56.9°W	9.8	1976	Japan place name	WGPSN
Bison	26.6°S 29.2°W	16.0	1976	USA (Kansas) place name	WGPSN
Bjerknes	43.4°S 188.6°W	94.0	1973	Vilhelm Bjerknes	WGPSN
Bland	18.5°N 251.3°W	7.1	1988	Bland, Missouri	WGPSN
Bled	21.8°N 31.5°W	7.8	1976	Bled, Slovenia	WGPSN
Blenheim	27.77°S 83.82°W	32	2025	Blenheim, New Zealand	WGPSN
Blitta	26.1°S 21.0°W	13.6	1976	Togo place name	WGPSN
Blois	23.8°N 56.0°W	12.5	1976	France place name	WGPSN
Blount	43.16°S 17.69°W	77.00	2025	Katherine Hoyt Price Blount	WGPSN
Bluff	23.7°N 250.0°W	6.6	1976	New Zealand place name	WGPSN
Blunck	27.5°S 36.9°W	17.2	2013	Jürgen Blunck, German historian	WGPSN
Boeddicker	15.0°S 197.7°W	109.0	1973	Otto Boeddicker	WGPSN
Bogia	44.3°S 276.84°W	38.0	2008	Papua New Guinea place name	WGPSN
Bogra	24.4°S 28.9°W	21.3	1976	Bangladesh place name	WGPSN
Bok	20.8°N 31.7°W	7.1	1976	Papua New Guinea place name	WGPSN
Bole	25.6°N 54.1°W	8.3	1976	Ghana place name	WGPSN
Bombala	27.9°S 254.0°W	38.1	1991	Australia (New S. Wales) place name	WGPSN
Bond	33.2°S 36.0°W	110.6	1973	George Phillips Bond	WGPSN
Bonestell	42.3°N 30.5°W	42.4	1997	Chesley Bonestell	WGPSN
Bonneville	14.6°S 175.5°E	0.21	(informal)	Lake Bonneville	—
Boola	81.31°N 105.7°W	17.25	2006	Guinea place name	WGPSN
Bopolu	2.95°S 6.33°W	19.3	2006	Bopolu, Liberia	WGPSN
Bor	18.4°N 33.8°W	4.3	1976	Russia place name	WGPSN
Bordeaux	23.4°N 49.0°W	1.8	1979	Bordeaux, France	WGPSN
Boru	24.6°S 27.9°W	10.9	1976	Russia place name	WGPSN
Bouguer	18.7°S 332.8°W	107.0	1973	Pierre Bouguer	WGPSN
Boulia	23.1°S 248.8°W	10.5	1991	Australia (Queensland) place name	WGPSN
Bozkir	44.5°S 32.2°W	84.0	1976	Bozkır, Konya, Turkey	WGPSN
Bradbury		63.2	2015	Raymond Douglas "Ray"; American author (1920–2012)	WGPSN
Brashear	54.2°S 119.2°W	79.0	1973	John Brashear	WGPSN
Bree	37.6°N 210.4°W	28.8	2014	Belgium place name	WGPSN
Bremerhaven	23.9°N 48.7°W	2.5	1979	Bremerhaven, Germany	WGPSN
Briault	10.2°S 270.4°W	96.6	1973	P. Briault	WGPSN
Bridgetown	22.1°N 47.2°W	1.3	1979	Bridgetown, Barbados	WGPSN
Bristol	22.3°N 47.0°W	3.0	1979	Bristol, England, UK	WGPSN
Broach	23.7°N 57.0°W	12.0	1976	India place name	WGPSN
Bronkhorst	10.7°S 55.3°W	17.9	2006	Netherlands place name	WGPSN
Brush	21.9°N 248.7°W	6.4	1976	USA (Colorado) place name	WGPSN
Bulhar	50.7°N 225.6°W	18.7	1979	Somalia place name	WGPSN
Bunge	34.2°S 48.7°W	73.7	1979	Alexander Bunge	WGPSN
Bunnik	38.4°S 142.1°W	29.0	2016	Netherlands place name	WGPSN
Burroughs	72.4°S 243.0°W	125.7	1973	Edgar Rice Burroughs	WGPSN
Burton	14.1°S 156.4°W	123.0	1973	Charles E. Burton	WGPSN
Buta	23.5°S 32.5°W	11.0	1979	Dem. Rep. Congo place name	WGPSN
Butte	5.2°S 39.0°W	13.0	1976	Butte, Montana	WGPSN
Byala		26.23	2013	Town in Bulgaria	WGPSN
Byrd	65.5°S 232.2°W	126.8	1976	Richard E. Byrd	WGPSN
Byske	5.0°S 34.0°W	13.5	1976	Sweden place name	WGPSN

back to top

== C ==
Crater	Coordinates	Diameter (km)	Date approved	Named after	Ref
Cádiz	23.4°N 49.1°W	1.5	1979	Cádiz, Spain	WGPSN
Cagli	4.73°N 356.45°E	28.16	2018	Cagli, Italy	WGPSN
Cairns	23.8°N 47.5°W	8.6	1976	Australia (Queensland) place name	WGPSN
Calahorra	26.7°N 38.7°W	35.2	1997	Spain place name	WGPSN
Calamar	18.5°N 55.0°W	7.2	1988	Colombia place name	WGPSN
Calbe	25.4°S 28.9°W	13.3	1976	Germany place name	WGPSN
Camargo	17.9°N 250.4°W	4.7	1988	Bolivia place name	WGPSN
Camichel	2.3°N 51.6°W	65.3	2012	Henri Camichel, French astronomer	WGPSN
Camiling	0.8°S 38.1°W	22.5	1976	Philippines place name	WGPSN
Camiri	45.0°S 42.2°W	26.4	1976	Bolivia place name	WGPSN
Campbell	54.7°S 194.6°W	129.0	1973	John W. Campbell and William Wallace Campbell	WGPSN
Campos	22.0°S 27.9°W	8.1	1976	Brazil place name	WGPSN
Can	48.5°N 14.7°W	8.4	1976	Çan, Çanakkale, Turkey	WGPSN
Canala	24.61°N 80.09°W	12	2011	New Caledonia place name	WGPSN
Cañas	31.5°S 270.3°W	42.0	1991	Puerto Rico place name	WGPSN
Canaveral	47.1°N 224.2°W	3.3	1979	Cape Canaveral, FL, USA	WGPSN
Canberra	47.5°N 227.4°W	3.0	1979	Canberra, Australia	WGPSN
Cangwu	42.2°N 89.7°W	14.0	1991	China place name	WGPSN
Canillo	10.23°N 243.61°W	35.0	2009	Andorra place name	WGPSN
Cankuzo	19.6°S 308.0°W	48.5	2010	Burundi place name	WGPSN
Canso	21.6°N 60.7°W	27.4	1988	Canso, Canada	WGPSN
Cantoura	15.0°N 51.8°W	51.4	1988	Venezuela place name	WGPSN
Capen	6.57°N 345.73°W	70.0	2008	Charles F. Capen	WGPSN
Cardona	19.9°S 32.0°W	13.7	2015	Uruguay place name	WGPSN
Cartago	23.5°S 18.0°W	37.5	1976	Costa Rica place name	WGPSN
Cassini	23.8°N 328.2°W	412.0	1973	Giovanni Cassini	WGPSN
Castril	14.7°S 184.8°W	2.2	2006	Spain place name	WGPSN
Catota	51.67°N 333.02°E	1.3	2015	Village in Angola	WGPSN
Cave	21.8°N 35.7°W	8.4	1976	New Zealand place name	WGPSN
Caxias	29.3°S 100.8°W	25.4	1991	Duque de Caxias, Brazil	WGPSN
Cayon	36.3°N 246.4°W	27.3	2012	Saint Kitts and Nevis place name	WGPSN
Cefalù	23.63°N 38.97°W	5.3	2006	Italy place name	WGPSN
Cerulli	32.5°N 337.9°W	130.0	1973	Vincenzo Cerulli	WGPSN
Chafe	15.3°N 257.7°W	4.8	1988	Chafe, Nigeria	WGPSN
Chaman	61.11°S 309.13°W	48.1	2006	Pakistan place name	WGPSN
Chamba	14.29°N 335.62°W	37	2019	India place name	WGPSN
Chamberlin	66.1°S 124.5°W	120.4	1973	Thomas Chamberlin	WGPSN
Changsŏng	23.7°N 57.4°W	35.0	1976	Korea place name	WGPSN
Chapais	22.6°S 20.6°W	37.4	1976	Chapais, Canada	WGPSN
Charleston	22.9°N 47.9°W	1.5	1979	Charleston, South Carolina, USA	WGPSN
Charlier	68.7°S 168.7°W	113.1	1973	Carl Charlier	WGPSN
Charlieu	38.5°N 84.1°W	19.1	1991	France place name	WGPSN
Chatturat	35.7°N 95.1°W	8.2	1991	Chatturat District, Chaiyaphum, Thailand	WGPSN
Chauk	23.6°N 56.0°W	10.0	1976	Burma place name	WGPSN
Cheb	24.4°S 19.5°W	8.3	1976	Czech Republic place name	WGPSN
Chefu	23.1°S 247.9°W	11.5	1991	Mozambique place name	WGPSN
Chekalin	24.5°S 26.9°W	89.3	1976	Turkmenistan place name	WGPSN
Chia	1.6°N 59.8°W	96.0	1985	Spain place name	WGPSN
Chimbote	1.5°S 39.8°W	67.2	1976	Peru place name	WGPSN
Chincoteague	41.5°N 236.0°W	37.0	1979	Chincoteague, Virginia, USA	WGPSN
Chinju	4.6°S 42.2°W	66.6	1976	South Korea place name	WGPSN
Chinook	22.7°N 55.5°W	20.0	1976	Canada (Alberta) place name	WGPSN
Chive	21.9°N 56.1°W	9.0	1976	Bolivia place name	WGPSN
Choctaw	41.5°S 37.3°W	23.8	1976	USA (Ohio) place name	WGPSN
Chom	38.9°N 2.6°W	5.5	1976	Tibet place name	WGPSN
Choyr	32.4°S 18.7°W	536.4	2015	Mongolia place name	WGPSN
Chukhung	38.47°N 287.58°E	45	2018	Chukhung, Nepal	WGPSN
Chupadero	6.15°N 276.65°W	8.0	2006	USA (New Mexico) place name	WGPSN
Chur	17.1°N 29.4°W	4.3	1976	Russia place name	WGPSN
Cilaos	35.7°S 230.5°W	21.4	2016	Reunion place name	WGPSN
Circle	22.4°S 25.6°W	11.5	1976	USA (Montana) place name	WGPSN
Clark	55.6°S 133.4°W	98.0	1973	Alvan Clark	WGPSN
Clogh	20.8°N 47.8°W	11.1	1976	Ireland place name	WGPSN
Clova	21.7°N 52.1°W	7.7	1988	Canada (Quebec) place name	WGPSN
Cluny	24.1°S 27.4°W	14.8	1976	France place name	WGPSN
Cobalt	26.0°S 27.1°W	11.5	1976	USA (Connecticut) place name	WGPSN
Coblentz	55.3°S 90.3°W	112.0	1973	William Coblentz	WGPSN
Cobres	11.8°S 153.8°W	94.0	1985	Argentina place name	WGPSN
Coimbra	4.15°N 5.35°W	34.7	2008	Portugal place name	WGPSN
Colón	23.0°N 47.2°W	2.0	1979	Colón, Panama	WGPSN
Columbus	29.8°S 166.1°W	119.0	1976	Christopher Columbus	WGPSN
Comas Sola	19.9°S 158.5°W	127.0	1973	Josep Comas Solà	WGPSN
Conches	4.3°S 34.3°W	21.2	1976	France place name	WGPSN
Concord	16.7°N 34.1°W	20.7	1976	USA (Massachusetts) place name	WGPSN
Cooma	24.0°S 108.4°W	17.3	1991	Australia (New South Wales) place name	WGPSN
Copernicus	49.2°S 169.2°W	294.0	1973	Nicolaus Copernicus	WGPSN
Corby	43.2°N 222.5°W	6.7	1979	Corby, England	WGPSN
Corinto	16.93°N 218.39°W	13.5	2008	El Salvador place name	WGPSN
Corozal	38.8°S 200.6°W	8.3	2011	Belize place name	WGPSN
Cost	15.2°N 256.0°W	11.6	1976	USA (Texas) place name	WGPSN
Cray	44.4°N 16.2°W	7.2	1976	England place name	WGPSN
Creel	6.1°S 38.9°W	9.3	1976	Mexico place name	WGPSN
Crewe	25.1°S 19.6°W	3.6	1976	Crewe, England, UK	WGPSN
Crivitz	14.7°S 185.3°W	6.1	2003	Crivitz, Germany	WGPSN
Crommelin	5.1°N 10.2°W	113.9	1973	Andrew Crommelin	WGPSN
Cross	30.23°S 157.79°W	67.5	2009	Charles Arthur Cross	WGPSN
Crotone	82.3°N 69.9°W	6.4	2006	Italy place name	WGPSN
Cruls	43.3°S 197.1°W	88.0	1973	Luis Cruls	WGPSN
Cruz	38.8°N 2.1°W	5.4	1976	Venezuela place name	WGPSN
Cue	36.1°S 266.9°W	10.7	1991	Western Australia place name	WGPSN
Culter	8.84°S 53.99°W	4.6	2006	Scotland place name	WGPSN
Curie	29.1°N 4.8°W	114.1	1973	Pierre Curie	WGPSN
Cypress	47.6°S 47.4°W	14.2	1976	USA (Illinois) place name	WGPSN

back to top

== D ==
Crater	Coordinates	Diameter (km)	Date approved	Named after	Ref
Da Vinci	1.4°N 39.4°W	100.2	1973	Leonardo da Vinci	WGPSN
Daan	40.8°S 268.5°W	12.5	1991	China place name	WGPSN
Dacono	18.34°N 77.95°W	2.2	2020	Dacono, Colorado	WGPSN
Daet	7.4°S 41.8°W	10.5	1976	Philippines place name	WGPSN
Daly	66.5°S 23.1°W	90.5	1973	Reginald Aldworth Daly	WGPSN
Dampier	15.73°S 203.63°W	27	2021	Australia place name	WGPSN
Dana	72.7°S 32.8°W	91.7	1973	James Dwight Dana	WGPSN
Danielson	7.93°N 7.11°W	66.7	2009	G. Edward Danielson	WGPSN
Dank	22.2°N 253.1°W	8.7	1976	Oman place name	WGPSN
Darvel	18.0°N 51.1°W	22.0	1988	Scotland place name	WGPSN
Darwin	57.3°S 19.5°W	178.0	1973	Charles Darwin and George Darwin	WGPSN
Davies	46.0°N -0.0°E	49.2	2006	Merton Davies	WGPSN
Dawes	9.3°S 322.0°W	191.0	1973	William Rutter Dawes	WGPSN
de Vaucouleurs	13.5°S 189.1°W	293.0	2000	Gérard de Vaucouleurs	WGPSN
Deba	24.2°S 17.4°W	10.3	1976	Nigeria place name	WGPSN
Dechu	42.25°S 202.01°E	22	2018	Dechu, India	WGPSN
Degana	23.72°S 314.5°E	57	2016	Town in India	WGPSN
Dein	38.5°N 2.6°W	26.0	1976	Papua New Guinea place name	WGPSN
Dejnev	25.5°S 164.8°W	156.0	1985	Semyon Dezhnev	WGPSN
Delta	46.3°S 39.2°W	8.1	1976	USA (Louisiana) place name	WGPSN
Denning	17.7°S 326.6°W	165.0	1973	William Frederick Denning	WGPSN
Dersu	22.9°N 52.0°W	6.6	1988	Russia place name	WGPSN
Dese	45.8°S 30.7°W	13.7	1976	Ethiopia place name	WGPSN
Deseado	80.61°S 70.2°E	10.2	1976	Argentina place name	WGPSN
Dessau	80.72°S 289.8°W	27.0	2006	Germany place name	WGPSN
Dia-Cau	0.4°S 42.7°W	29.7	1976	Vietnam place name	WGPSN
Dilly	13.24°N 202.9°W	1.3	2006	Dilly, Mali	WGPSN
Dingo	24.0°S 17.5°W	16.0	1976	Australia (Queensland) place name	WGPSN
Dinorwic	30.4°S 101.6°W	55.8	1991	Dinorwic, Canada	WGPSN
Dison	25.3°S 16.5°W	21.0	1976	Belgium place name	WGPSN
Dixie	17.9°N 56.0°W	28.7	1988	USA (Georgia) place name	WGPSN
Doba	10.91°N 240.46°W	26.3	2009	Chad place name	WGPSN
Dogana	10.12°S 53.65°W	41.2	2011	San Marino place name	WGPSN
Dokka	77.27°N 145.82°W	52.5	2006	Norway place name	WGPSN
Dokuchaev	61.0°S 127.2°W	78.0	1982	Vasily Dokuchaev	WGPSN
Dollfus	21.8°S 4.3°W	363.1	2013	Audouin Dollfus	WGPSN
Domoni	51.7°N 125.6°W	13.8	2012	Union of the Comoros place name	WGPSN
Doon	23.8°N 250.6°W	3.7	1988	Canada (Ontario) place name	WGPSN
Douglass	51.8°S 70.6°W	94.0	1973	Andrew E. Douglass	WGPSN
Dowa	31.67°S 249.86°W	42.0	2010	Malawi place name	WGPSN
Downe	16.1°S 184.3°W	28.0	2003	Downe, England	WGPSN
Drake	39.87°S 39.78°W	59.0	2025	Michael Julian Drake	WGPSN
Dromore	20.1°N 49.7°W	14.8	1976	Ireland place name	WGPSN
Du Martheray	5.5°N 266.5°W	102.0	1973	Maurice du Martheray	WGPSN
Du Toit	71.8°S 49.6°W	83.0	1973	Alexander du Toit	WGPSN
Dubki	35.3°S 55.3°W	9.0	1979	Russia place name	WGPSN
Dukhan	7.9°N 39.1°W	34.0	2012	Qatar place name	WGPSN
Dulovo	3.66°N 275.5°W	18.8	2006	Bulgaria place name	WGPSN
Dunhuang	81.0°S 48.5°W	12.1	1991	China place name	WGPSN
Dunkassa	37.8°S 137.1°W	8.0	2012	Benin place name	WGPSN
Dush	22.7°N 54.1°W	2.5	1988	Egypt place name	WGPSN
Dzeng	80.7°S 70.4°W	10.6	1991	Cameroon place name	WGPSN

back to top

== E ==
Crater	Coordinates	Diameter (km)	Approval date	Named after	Refs
Eads	28.8°S 30.0°W	2.3	1976	USA (Colorado) place name	WGPSN
Eagle	44.2°N 8.2°W	13.0	1976	Idaho place name	WGPSN
Eagle (Opportunity)	1.9°S 5.5°W	0.03	(informal)	Spacecraft Eagle, Apollo 11	—
Eberswalde	24.0°S 33.3°W	65.3	2006	Eberswalde, Germany	WGPSN
Echt	22.2°S 28.2°W	1.1	1976	Scotland place name	WGPSN
Edam	26.5°S 20.1°W	20.2	1976	Edam, Netherlands	WGPSN
Eddie	12.4°N 217.9°W	89.0	1973	Lindsay Eddie	WGPSN
Eger	48.6°S 51.9°W	13.0	1976	Eger, Hungary	WGPSN
Ehden	8.2°N 241.1°W	57.7	2009	Lebanon place name	WGPSN
Eil	42.1°N 9.8°W	5.7	1976	Somalia place name	WGPSN
Eilat	56.51°S 309.88°W	31.7	2006	Eilat, Israel	WGPSN
Ejriksson	19.4°S 173.9°W	49.0	1967	Leif Ericson	WGPSN
Elath	46.2°N 13.7°W	13.2	1976	Israel place name	WGPSN
Elim	80.21°S 263.21°W	43.0	2006	South Africa place name	WGPSN
Ellsley	36.6°N 83.4°W	11.1	1991	England place name	WGPSN
Elorza	8.74°S 55.3°W	47.0	2006	Venezuela place name	WGPSN
Ely	23.9°S 27.4°W	10.3	1976	USA (Nevada) place name	WGPSN
Emma Dean	2.0°S 5.5°W	0.10	(informal)	John Powell's Boat, USA	—
Endeavour	2.28°S 5.23°W	22.5	2008	Endeavour, Canada	WGPSN
Endurance	1.9°S 5.5°W	0.13	(informal)	HMS Endurance	—
Erebus	2.1°S 5.5°W	0.13	(informal)	HMS Erebus	—
Escalante	0.2°N 244.7°W	79.3	1973	F. Escalante	WGPSN
Escorial	77.0°N 55.4°W	22.7	1991	Spain place name	WGPSN
Esira	9.0°N 46.6°W	16.3	2014	Madagascar place name	WGPSN
Esk	45.6°N 7.1°W	3.9	1976	Australia (Queensland) place name	WGPSN
Espino	19.9°S 249.8°W	12.0	1991	Venezuela place name	WGPSN
Eudoxus	44.9°S 147.5°W	98.0	1973	Eudoxus of Cnidus	WGPSN
Evpatoriya	47.3°N 225.6°W	1.0	1979	Yevpatoria, Crimea, Ukraine	WGPSN

back to top

== F ==
Crater	Coordinates	Diameter (km)	Approval date	Named after	Refs
Faith	43.3°N 11.9°W	5.8	1976	USA (South Dakota) place name	WGPSN
Falun	24.2°S 24.7°W	10.2	1976	Sweden place name	WGPSN
Fancy	35.8°S 246.4°W	49.4	2012	Saint Vincent and the Grenadines place name	WGPSN
Faqu	24.8°S 253.8°W	12.4	1991	Jordan place name	WGPSN
Farim	44.7°S 220.7°W	3.9	2013	Farim, Guinea-Bissau	WGPSN
Fastov	25.3°S 20.4°W	10.3	1976	Ukraine place name	WGPSN
Fenagh	34.6°N 215.7°W	6.3	1991	Fenagh, Ireland	WGPSN
Fesenkov	21.8°N 86.7°W	87.0	1973	Vasily Fesenkov	WGPSN
Firsoff	2.66°N 9.42°W	90	2010	Axel Firsoff	WGPSN
Fitzroy	35.68°S 248°W	38.0	2010	Falkland Islands place name	WGPSN
Flammarion	25.4°N 311.8°W	173.0	1973	Camille Flammarion	WGPSN
Flat	25.7°S 19.6°W	2.5	1976	USA (Alaska) place name	WGPSN
Flateyri	35.86°S 330.92°E	9.5	2016	Village in Iceland	WGPSN
Flaugergues	17.0°S 340.8°W	245.0	1973	Honoré Flaugergues	WGPSN
Floq	15.1°N 252.9°W	2.2	1988	Albania place name	WGPSN
Flora	45.0°S 51.5°W	19.0	1976	USA (Mississippi) place name	WGPSN
Focas	33.9°N 347.3°W	76.5	1973	Jean Focas	WGPSN
Fontana	63.2°S 72.2°W	80.0	1973	Francesco Fontana	WGPSN
Foros	33.7°S 27.9°W	24.5	1979	Foros, Ukraine	WGPSN
Forro	48.89°S 33.82°W	54.0	2025	Madeleine Barnothy Forro	WGPSN
Fournier	4.4°S 287.4°W	118.0	1973	Georges Fournier	WGPSN
Fram	1.9°S 5.5°W	0.01	(informal)	Fram	—
Freedom	43.7°N 9.1°W	12.9	1976	USA (Oklahoma) place name	WGPSN
Funchal	23.2°N 49.5°W	1.7	1979	Funchal, Madeira	WGPSN

back to top

== G ==
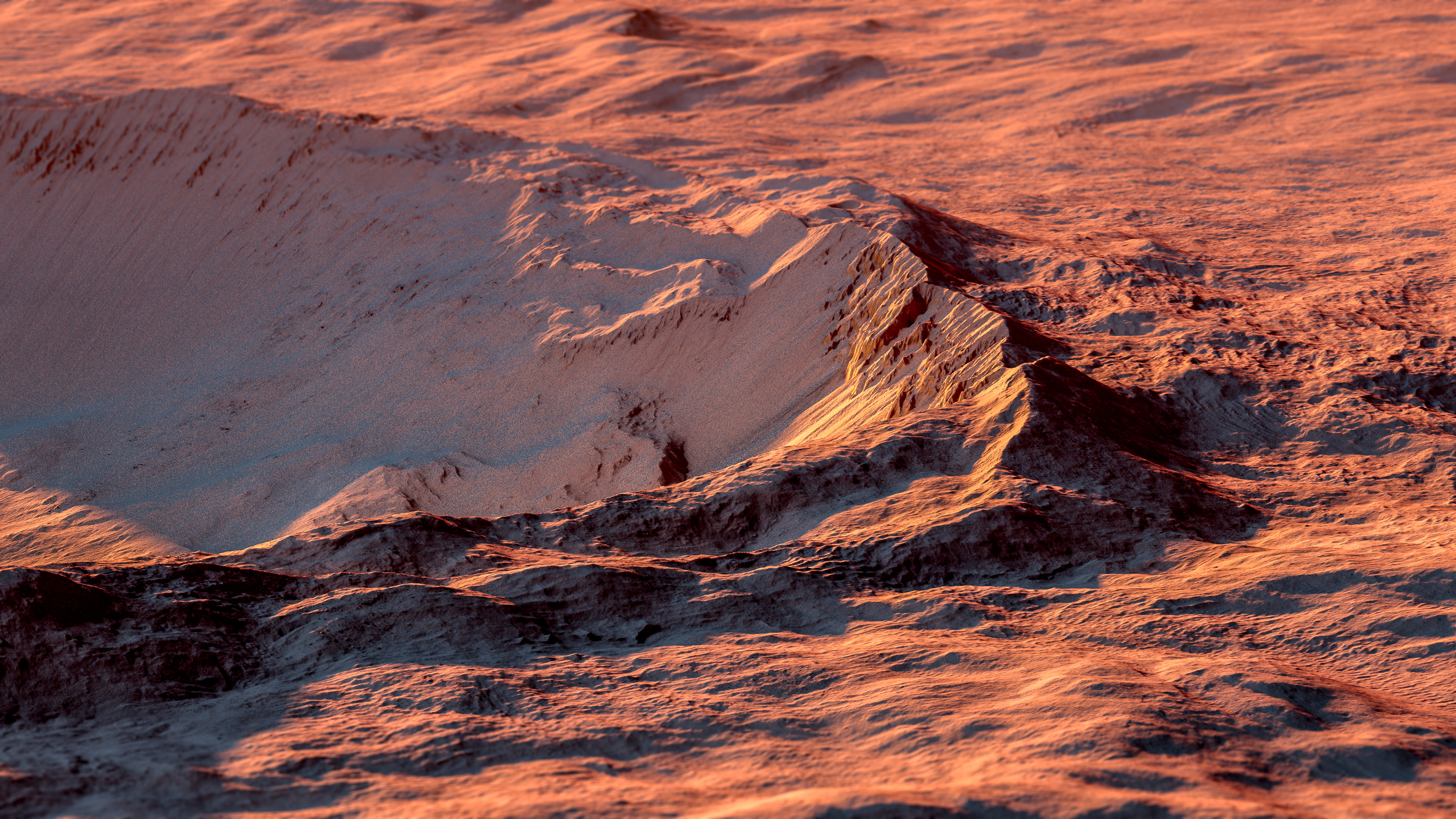
Primary Cavity of Rayed Gratteri Crater

Crater	Coordinates	Diameter (km)	Approval date	Named after	Refs
Gaan	39.0°N 3.5°W	2.8	1976	Somalia place name	WGPSN
Gagra	20.9°S 22.2°W	13.3	1976	Georgia place name	WGPSN
Gah	45.0°S 32.7°W	2.7	1976	Indonesia place name	WGPSN
Galap	37.67°S 167.19°W	5.9	2009	Palau place name	WGPSN
Galdakao	13.5°S 183.5°W	35.0	2003	Galdakao, Basque Country, Spain	WGPSN
Gale	5.5°S 222.3°W	155.3	1991	Walter Gale	WGPSN
Gali	44.1°S 37.2°W	26.4	1976	Georgia place name	WGPSN
Galilaei	5.7°N 27.0°W	137.3	1973	Galileo Galilei	WGPSN
Galle	51.2°S 30.9°W	230.0	1973	Johann Gottfried Galle	WGPSN
Galu	22.3°S 21.7°W	12.5	1976	Dem. Rep. Congo place name	WGPSN
Gamboa	40.77°N 44.43°W	33.0	2006	Panama place name	WGPSN
Gan	61.7°N 229.0°W	20.6	2013	Maldives place name	WGPSN
Gander	31.5°S 265.9°W	38.0	1991	Canada (Newfoundland and Labrador) place name	WGPSN
Gandu	45.7°S 47.3°W	8.8	1976	Brazil place name	WGPSN
Gandzani	34.5°N 91.0°W	54.8	1991	Georgia place name	WGPSN
Gardo	26.9°S 24.8°W	17.2	1976	Somalia place name	WGPSN
Gari	36.2°S 71.3°W	9.4	1979	Russia place name	WGPSN
Garm	48.6°N 9.1°W	5.0	1976	Tajikistan place name	WGPSN
Garni	11.52°S 290.31°W	2.57	2015	Garni, Armenia	WGPSN
Garu	6.39°S 141.28°E	32	2018	Garu, Ghana	WGPSN
Gasa	35.68°S 230.72°W	6.5	2009	Gasa, Bhutan	WGPSN
Gastre	24.9°N 247.5°W	7.0	1976	Argentina place name	WGPSN
Gilbert	68.2°S 273.7°W	126.4	1973	Grove Karl Gilbert	WGPSN
Gill	15.9°N 354.6°W	83.0	1973	David Gill	WGPSN
Glazov	20.8°S 26.6°W	24.7	1976	Russia place name	WGPSN
Gledhill	53.5°S 273.0°W	82.5	1973	Joseph Gledhill	WGPSN
Glendore	18.5°N 51.8°W	8.0	1988	Ireland place name	WGPSN
Glide	8.2°S 43.2°W	10.5	1976	USA (Oregon) place name	WGPSN
Globe	23.9°S 27.4°W	51.7	1976	USA (Arizona) place name	WGPSN
Goba	23.5°S 21.1°W	10.8	1976	Ethiopia place name	WGPSN
Goff	23.5°N 255.2°W	7.9	1976	Somalia place name	WGPSN
Gokwe	27.14°S 78.12°E	2.16	2017	Town in Zimbabwe	WGPSN
Gol	47.5°N 10.7°W	9.6	1976	Norway place name	WGPSN
Gold	20.2°N 31.3°W	9.0	1976	USA (Pennsylvania) place name	WGPSN
Golden	22.2°S 33.5°W	20.2	1976	USA (Illinois) place name	WGPSN
Goldstone	48.0°N 225.5°W	1.0	1979	Goldstone Observatory, CA, USA	WGPSN
Gori	23.2°S 28.9°W	6.2	1979	Georgia place name	WGPSN
Graff	21.4°S 206.3°W	158.0	1973	Kasimir Graff	WGPSN
Gratteri	17.71°S 160.18°W	7.3	2006	Sicily place name	WGPSN
Greeley	36.8°S 3.9°W	457.45	2015	Ronald Greeley	WGPSN
Green	52.7°S 8.4°W	184.0	1973	Nathaniel E. Green	WGPSN
Greg	38.6°S 247.2°W	68.0	2010	Percy Greg	WGPSN
Grindavik	25.39°N 39.07°W	12.0	2006	Grindavík, Iceland	WGPSN
Gringauz	20.7°S 35.7°W	71.0	2013	Konstantin Gringauz	WGPSN
Grójec	21.7°S 30.9°W	38.5	1976	Poland place name	WGPSN
Groves	4.1°S 44.6°W	11.2	1976	USA (Texas) place name	WGPSN
Guaymas	25.9°N 45.1°W	20.0	1976	Mexico place name	WGPSN
Guir	21.8°S 20.5°W	18.9	1976	Mali place name	WGPSN
Gulch	16.0°N 251.1°W	8.2	1976	Ethiopia place name	WGPSN
Gunnison	44.0°S 257.2°W	40.8	2003	USA (Colorado) place name	WGPSN
Gusev	14.7°S 184.6°W	166.0	1976	Matvey Gusev	WGPSN
Gwash	39.3°N 3.2°W	4.7	1976	Pakistan place name	WGPSN

back to top

== See also ==
- List of catenae on Mars
- List of craters on Mars
- List of mountains on Mars
