= Briault =

Briault may refer to:

- Jean-Claude Briault (born 1947), New Caledonian politician
- P. Briault (died 1922), French astronomer
- Briault (crater), an impact crater in the Mare Tyrrhenum quadrangle of Mars
