= Baltisk =

Baltisk may refer to:

- Baltiysk, a town in Russia
- Baltisk (crater), a crater on Mars
