= Bamberg (crater) =

Crater on Mars

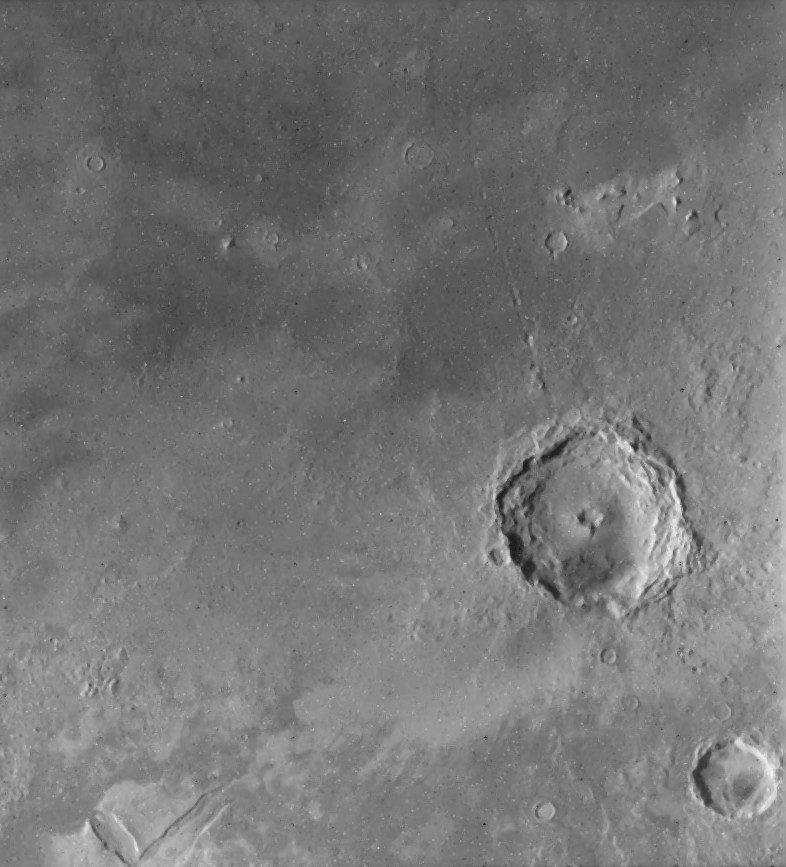
- Viking Orbiter 2 image with Bamberg at right
- Planet: Mars
- Coordinates: 39.71°N 356.9°E
- Quadrangle: Mare Acidalium
- Diameter: 55.7 km (34.6 mi)
- Eponym: Bamberg, Germany

Bamberg is an impact crater in the Mare Acidalium quadrangle of Mars. It is named after the town Bamberg in Germany. CTX images and HiRISE images from the Mars Reconnaissance Orbiter have shown that the crater contains gullies. Martian gullies are believed to have formed through rather recent flows of liquid water.

Gullies are visible in the pictures below. On the basis of their form, aspects, positions, and location amongst and apparent interaction with features thought to be rich in water ice, many researchers believed that the processes carving the gullies involve liquid water. However, this remains a topic of active research. As soon as gullies were discovered, researchers began to image many gullies over and over, looking for possible changes. By 2006, some changes were found. Later, with further analysis it was determined that the changes could have occurred by dry granular flows rather than being driven by flowing water.

With continued observations many more changes were found in Gasa Crater and others. With more repeated observations, more and more changes have been found; since the changes occur in the winter and spring, experts are tending to believe that gullies were formed from dry ice. Before-and-after images demonstrated the timing of this activity coincided with seasonal carbon-dioxide frost and temperatures that would not have allowed for liquid water. When dry ice frost changes to a gas, it may lubricate dry material to flow especially on steep slopes. In some years frost, perhaps as thick as 1 meter.

The crater Dein is south of Bamberg. Between the two are a number of small craters named Gwash, Lutsk, Gaan, Chom, and Cruz.

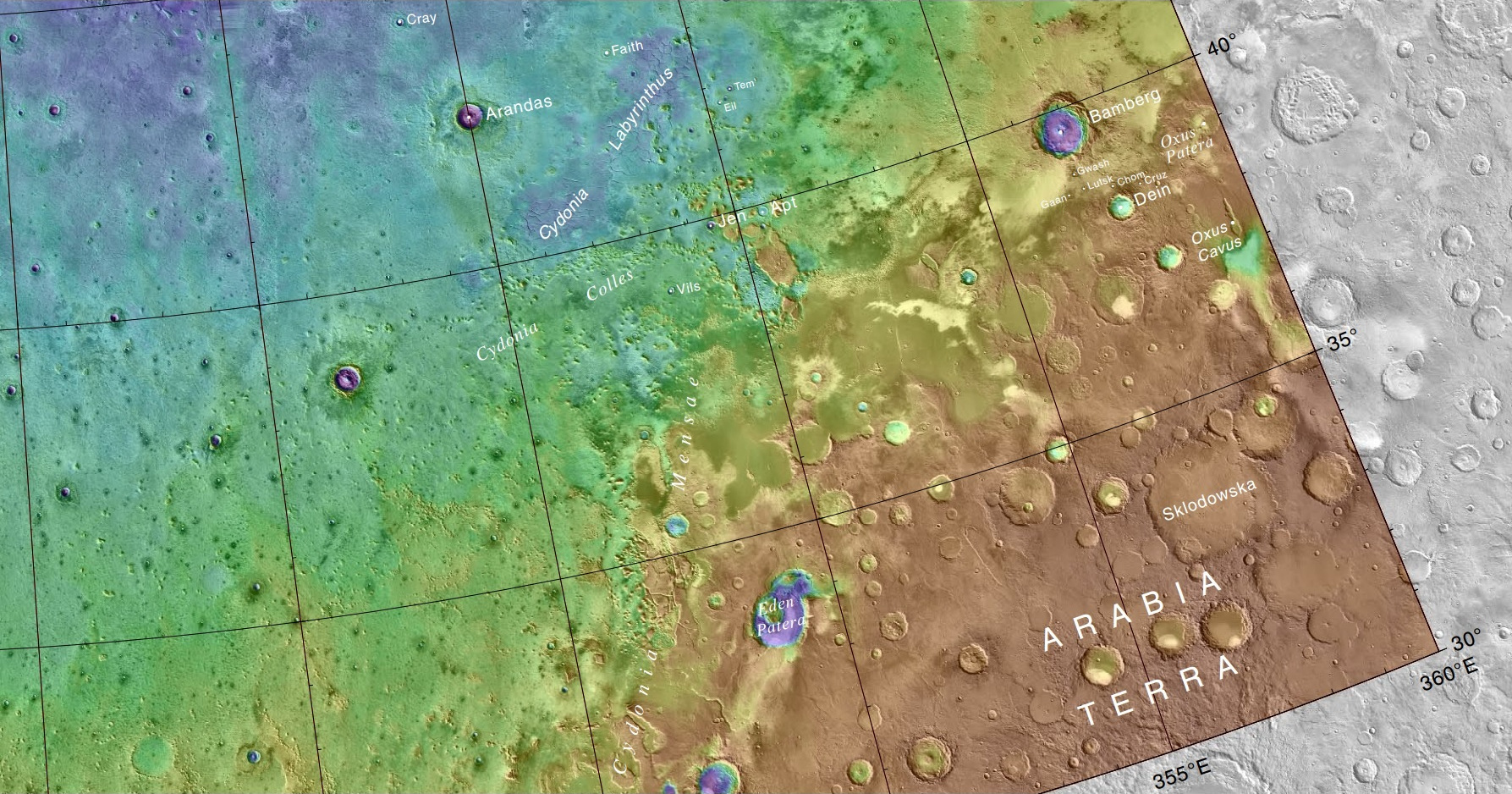
MOLA map showing Bamberg and other nearby craters. Color indicates elevation.

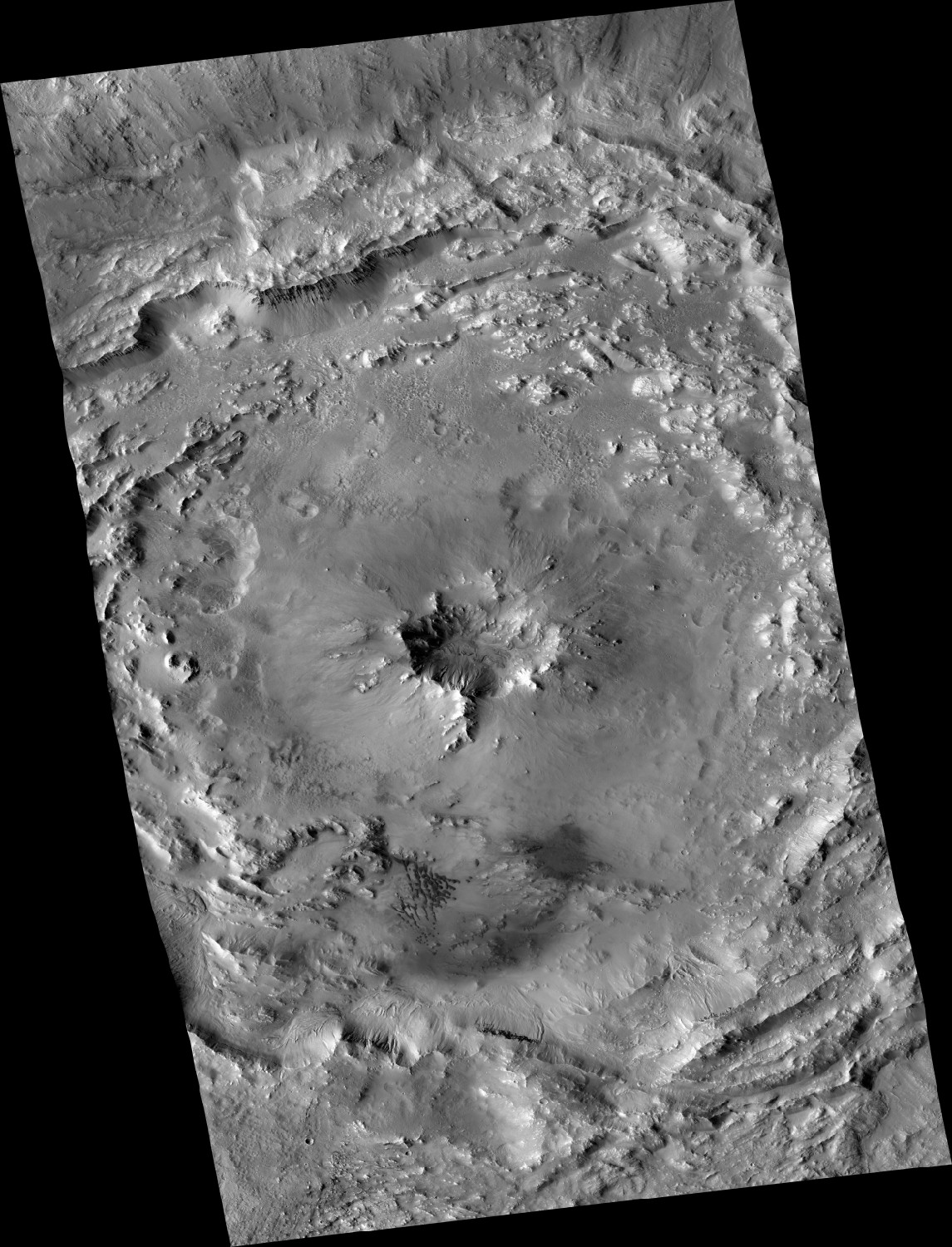
CTX image from MRO.

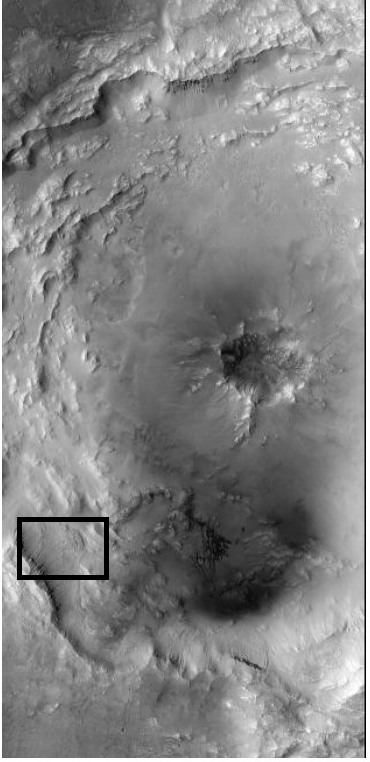
Context for next image of Bamberg. Box shows where the next image came from. This is another CTX image.

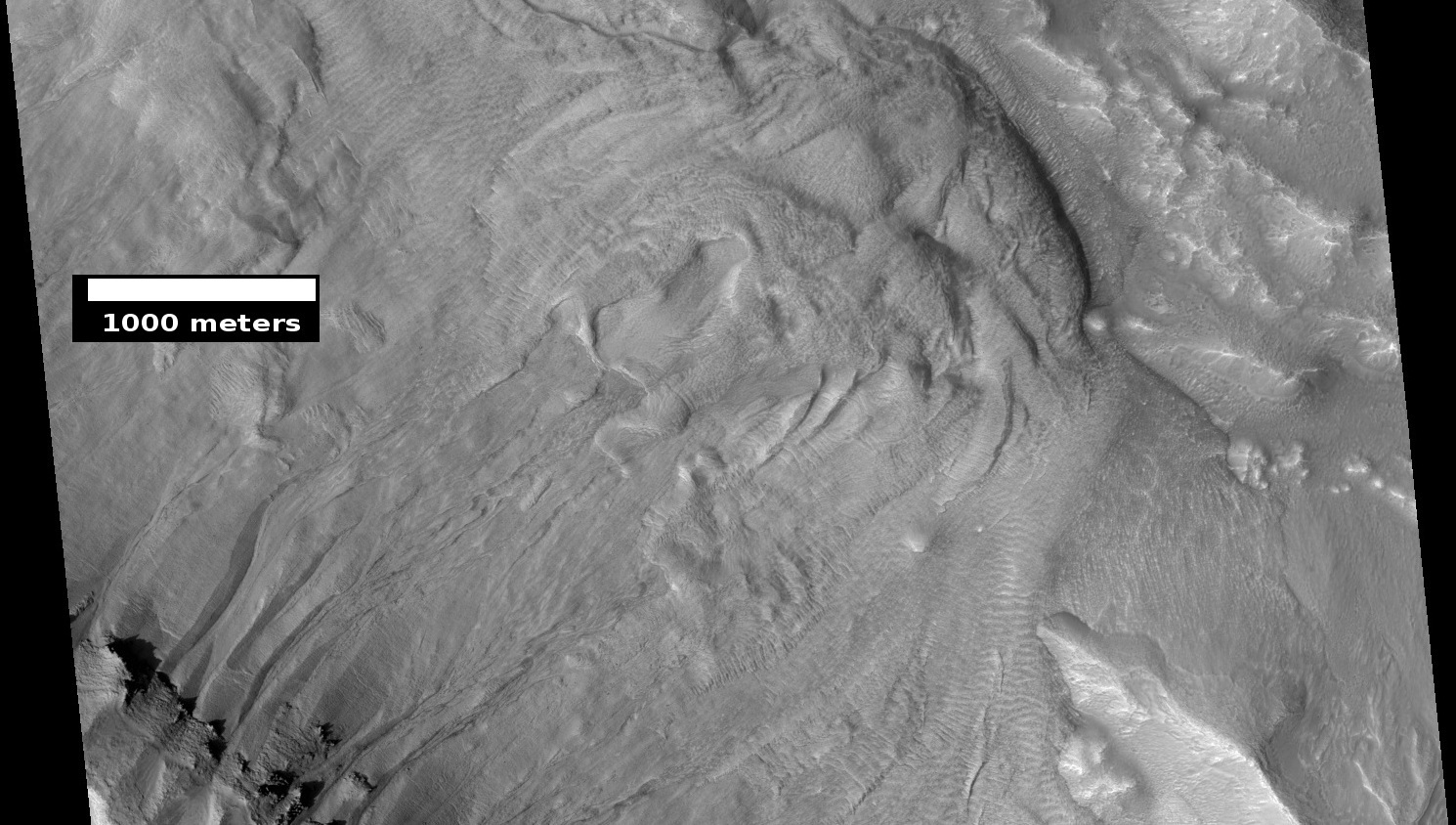
Gullies and massive flow of material, as seen by HiRISE under HiWish program. Gullies are enlarged in next two images.

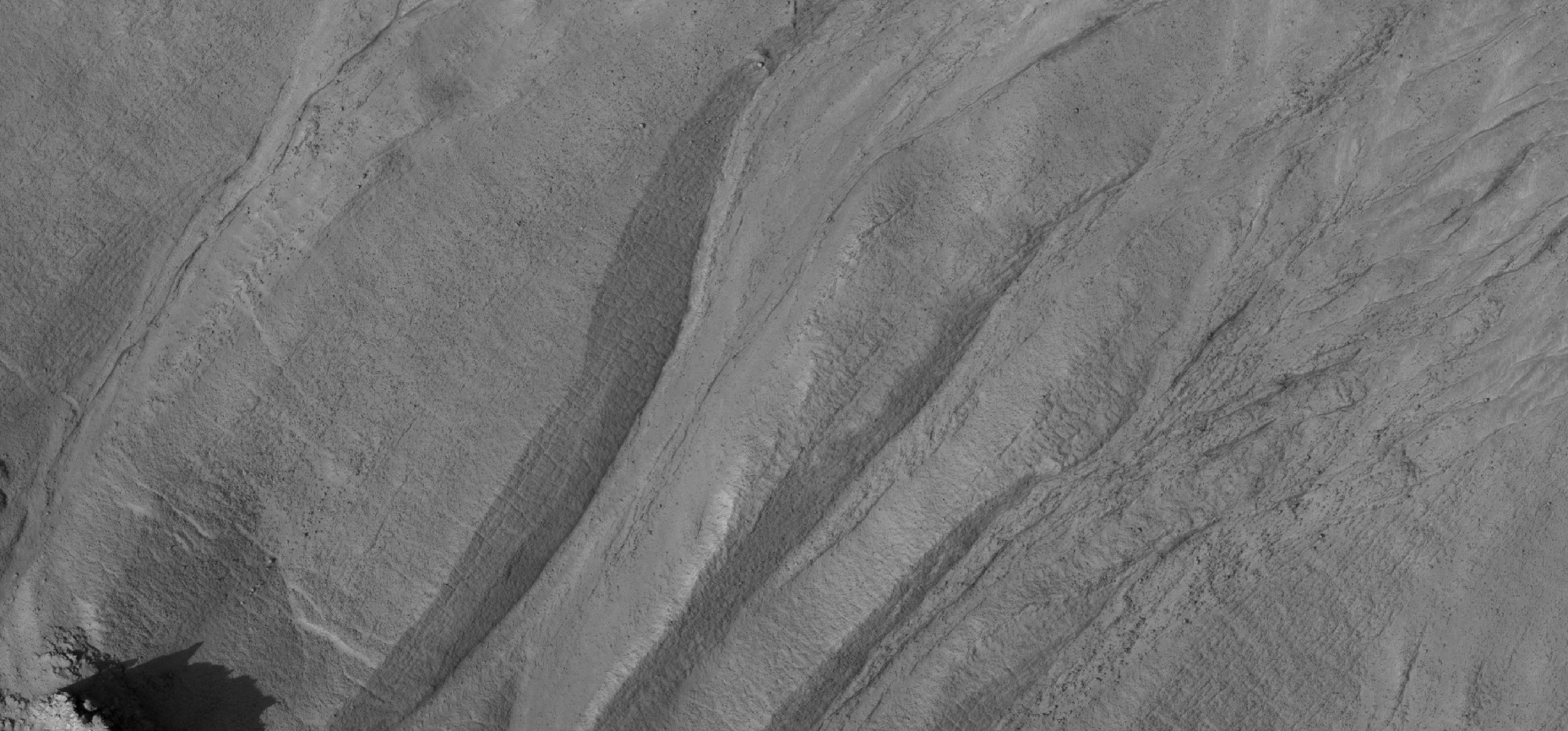
Close up view of some gullies, as seen by HiRISE under the HiWish program.

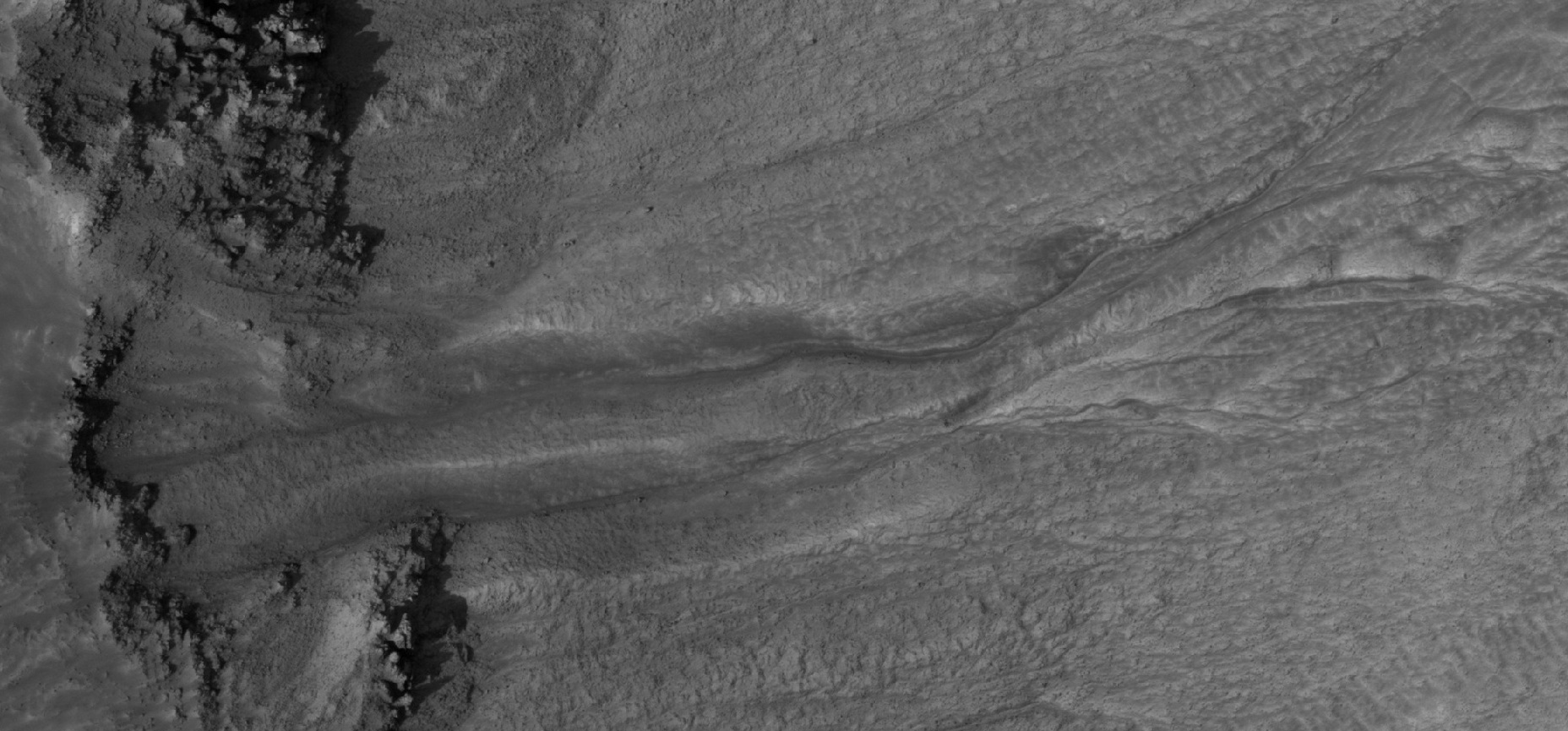
Close up view of another gully in same HiRISE picture. Picture taken under HiWish program.

== See also ==
- Water on Mars
- Geology of Mars
- Martian Gullies
- Mare Acidalium quadrangle
- Climate of Mars
- Impact crater
- List of craters on Mars
- List of quadrangles on Mars
- Geological history of Mars
