= Andrey Arkhangelsky =

Russian geologist and professor at Moscow State University (1879-1940)

- Андре́й Дми́триевич Арха́нгельский
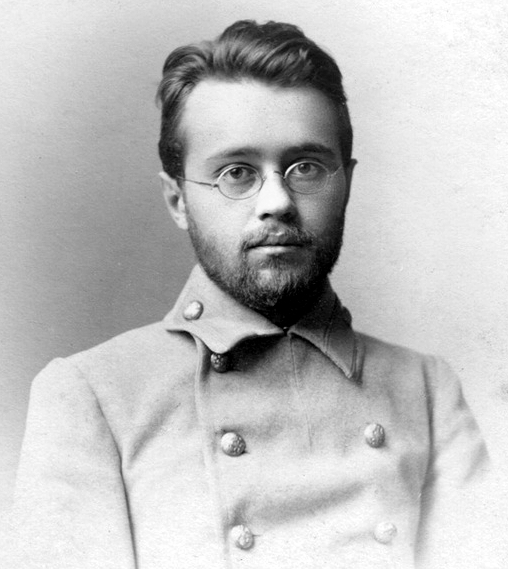
- Andrey Arkhangelsky
- Born: Andrey Dmitriyevich Arkhangelsky; December 8, 1879; Ryazan, Russian Empire
- Died: June 16, 1940 (aged 60); Moscow, Soviet Union
- Resting place: Novodevichy Cemetery
- Education: Moscow State University
- Occupations: Geologist, botanist, professor
- Awards: Lenin Prize (1928)
- Scientific career
- Fields: Geology
- Workplaces: Moscow State University
- Academic advisors: A.P. Pavlov

Signature
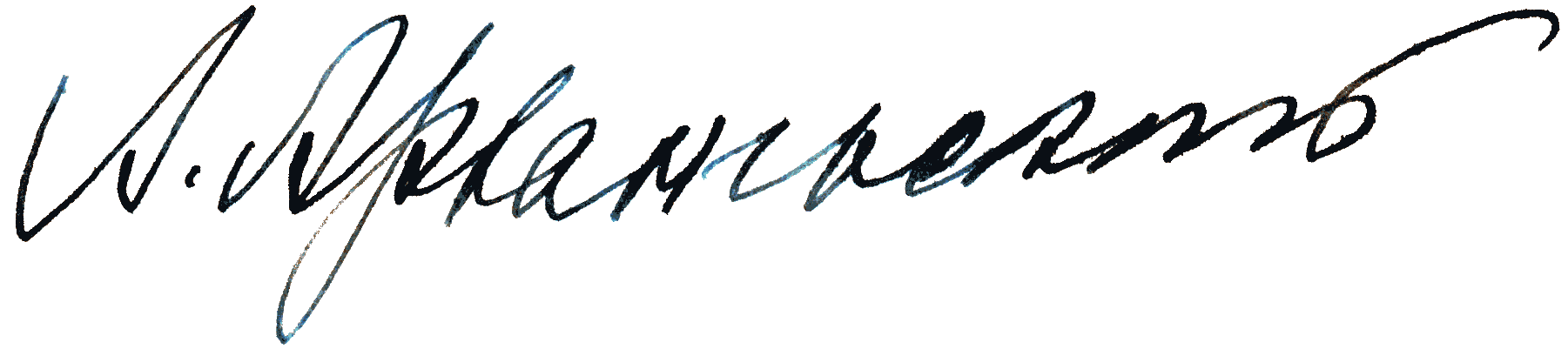

Andrey Dmitriyevich Arkhangelsky (Russian: Андре́й Дми́триевич Арха́нгельский) (December 8, 1879 – June 16, 1940) was a geologist and professor at Moscow State University. He was Corresponding Member of the Division of Physical-Mathematical Sciences since 1925, and Academician of the Division of Physical-Mathematical Sciences since 1929.

He won the Lenin Prize in 1928.

== Memoria ==
A crater on Mars and Arkhangel'skiy Nunataks in Antarctica are named after him.
