= Boeddicker (crater) =

Crater on Mars

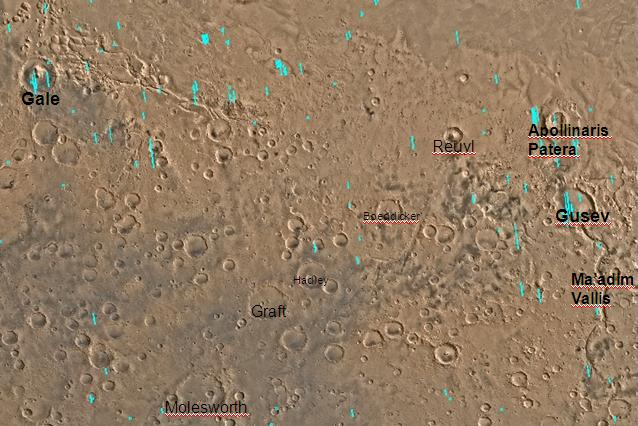
- Map of Aeolis quadrangle. The Spirit Rover landed in Gusev crater. It found volcanic rocks that probably came from Apollinaris Patera. A large pile of layered rocks sits in the middle of Gale Crater.
- Planet: Mars
- Coordinates: 15°S 197.7°W
- Quadrangle: Aeolis
- Diameter: 109 km
- Eponym: Otto Boeddicker, a German astronomer (1853-1937)

Boeddicker is a crater in the Aeolis quadrangle of Mars, located at 15° south latitude and 197.7° west longitude. It is 109 km in diameter and was named after Otto Boeddicker, a German astronomer (1853–1937).

Boeddicker Crater was discussed as a landing site for the 2003 Mars Exploration Rovers. It was one of 25 from a list of 185 after the FirstLanding Site Workshop for the 2003 Mars Exploration Rovers, January 24–25, 2001, at NASA Ames Research Center.

Boeddicker Crater has a uniformly sloped crater floor which tracks with a gradational albedo change, similar to Gusev crater to the east. Some researchers have hypothesized that this could be the result of aeolian deposition.

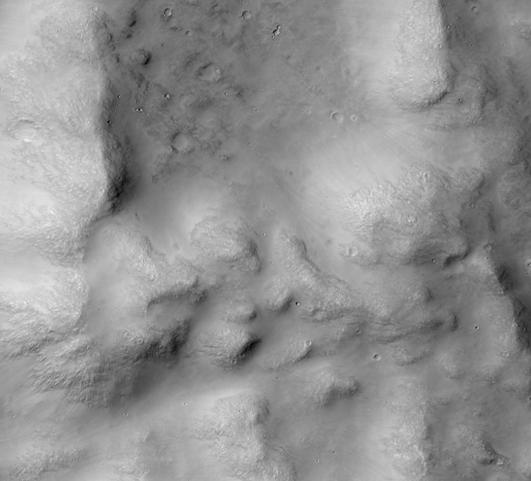
Boeddicker Crater Floor, as seen by HiRISE.

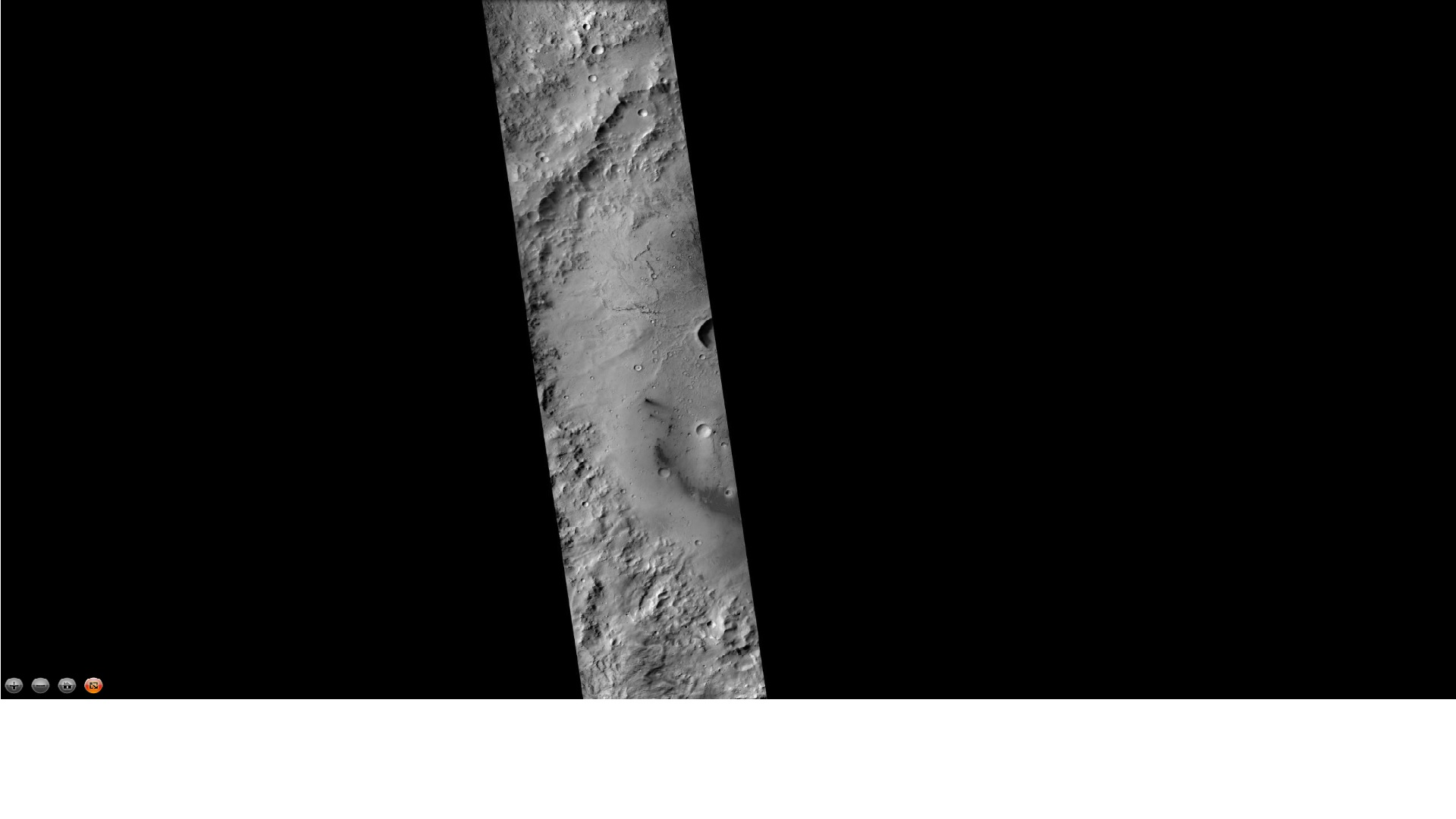
West side of Boeddicker Crater, as seen by CTX camera (on Mars Reconnaissance Orbiter).

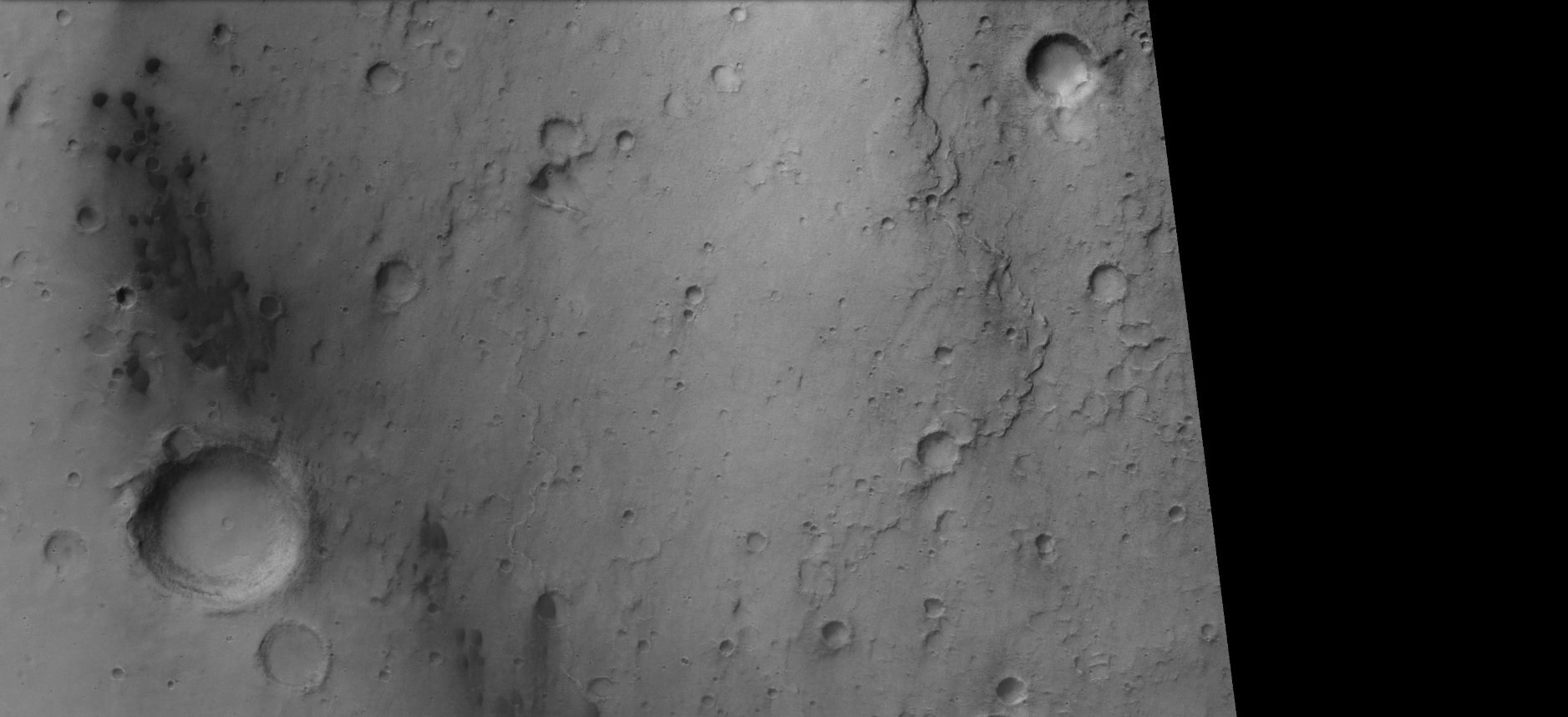
Enlargement of previous image showing dunes on floor of Boeddicker Crater, as seen by CTX camera (on Mars Reconnaissance Orbiter).

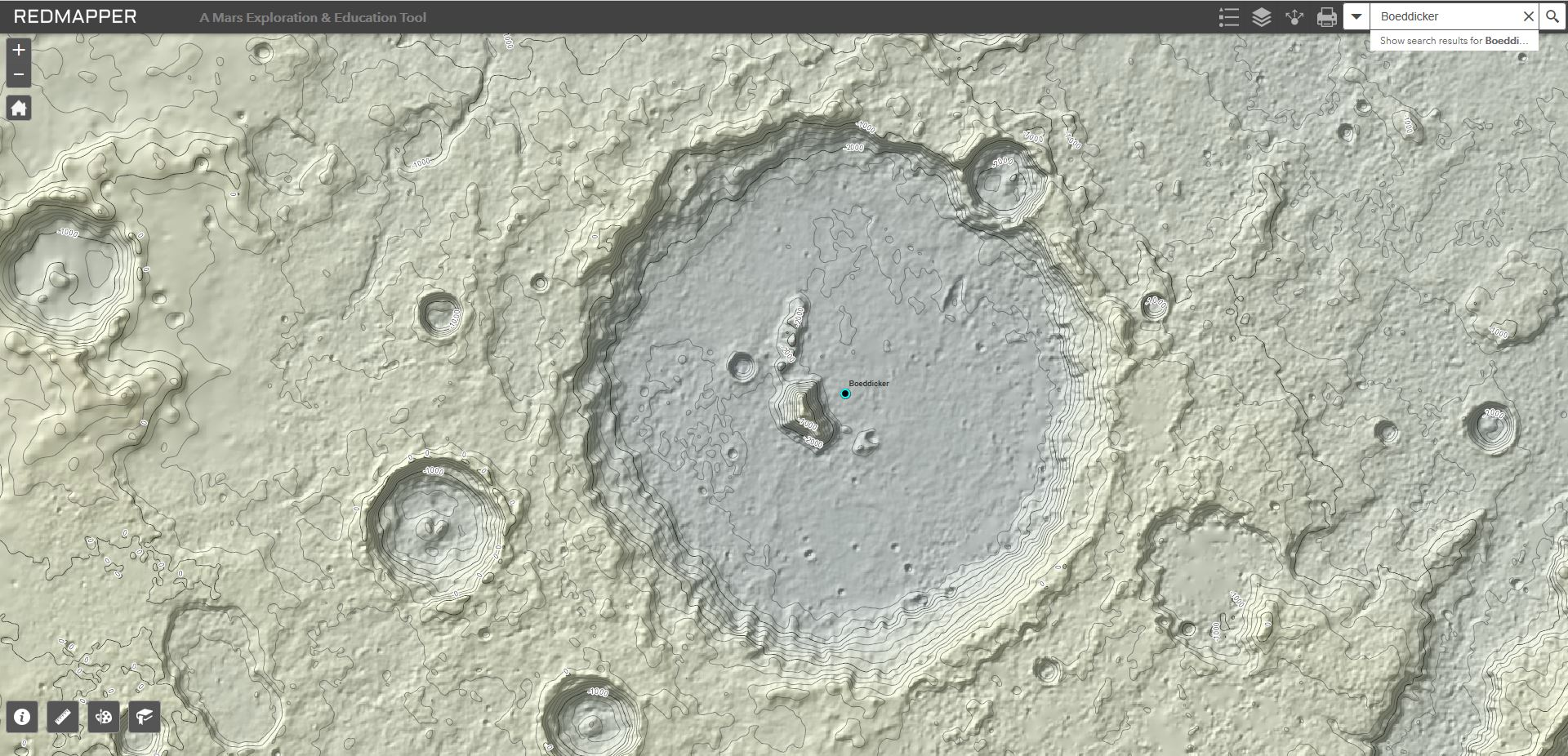
A topographic map showing Boaddicker crater and the central hill which rises about 1,800 meters off the crater floor.

== See also ==
- Groundwater on Mars
- Geology of Mars
- HiRISE
- Impact crater
- Impact event
- List of craters on Mars
- Ore resources on Mars
- Planetary nomenclature
