= Arta, Zabaykalsky Krai =

Arta Арта
- Selo
- Location within Zabaykalsky Krai Location within Russia
- Coordinates: 51°15′N 112°23′E
- Country: Russia
- Region: Zabaykalsky Krai
- District: Ulyotovsky District
- Time zone: UTC+9:00

Arta (Russian: Арта) is a rural locality (a selo) in Ulyotovsky District, Zabaykalsky Krai, Russia. Population: 540 (2021 census); 770 (2010 census); 903 (2002 census); There are 10 streets in this selo.

== Geography ==
This rural locality is located 14 km from Ulyoty (the district's administrative centre), 116 km from Chita (capital of Zabaykalsky Krai) and 5,229 km from Moscow. Balzoy is the nearest rural locality.
