= Lindsay Eddie =

South-African amateur astronomer (c. 1845–1913)

Lindsay Atkins Eddie
- Born: c. 1845; Grahamstown
- Died: 13 October 1913 (Age 88); Grahamstown
- Known for: Observations of comets
- Spouse: Hermina Fredrica Upton
- Scientific career
- Fields: Astronomy

Lindsay Atkins Eddie FRAS (c. 1845 – 13 October 1913) was a South-African amateur astronomer, known for his observations of Venus, Mercury and Mars and 21 comets. He was elected a fellow of the Royal Astronomical Society in 1880. He saw active military service in South Africa and his final rank was that of a Major.

== Personal life ==
Eddie was the son of an army Surgeon, William Cruikshank Eddie and Sarah Eddie (née Kaye). He had one brother and one sister. He grew up in Grahamstown and joined the civil service of the Cape of Good Hope in 1878. By 1892 he was clerk to judge Jones of the Eastern District Court, where he and W.G. Atherstone were asked to analyse a judgement of a libel case that a jury had been unable to decide. The case revolved around W.B. Shaw who had accused dean Williams of St Michael and St George Cathedral, Grahamstown of being a liar.

He served in the military for 20 years. In 1876 he commanded the Grahamstown Rifles during an invasion of Xhosas just prior to the 9th Xhosa War. In 1885 he was a lieutenant in command of the Bechuanaland Expedition led by Charles Warren. His final rank was that of a Major when he retired in 1901.

On 2 September 1873, he married Hermina Fredrica Upton at St Bartholomew's Anglican church in Grahamstown and they had five children.

He died on 13 October 1913 in Grahamstown.

== Astronomy ==
During his early education he spent some time under the guidance of Dr. Richards (later Bishop Richards) who inspired him in his astronomical pursuits. His initial equipment was a 9.5-inch reflecting telescope in Grahamstown but he later used a 76 mm refractor and a more powerful 240 mm reflector.

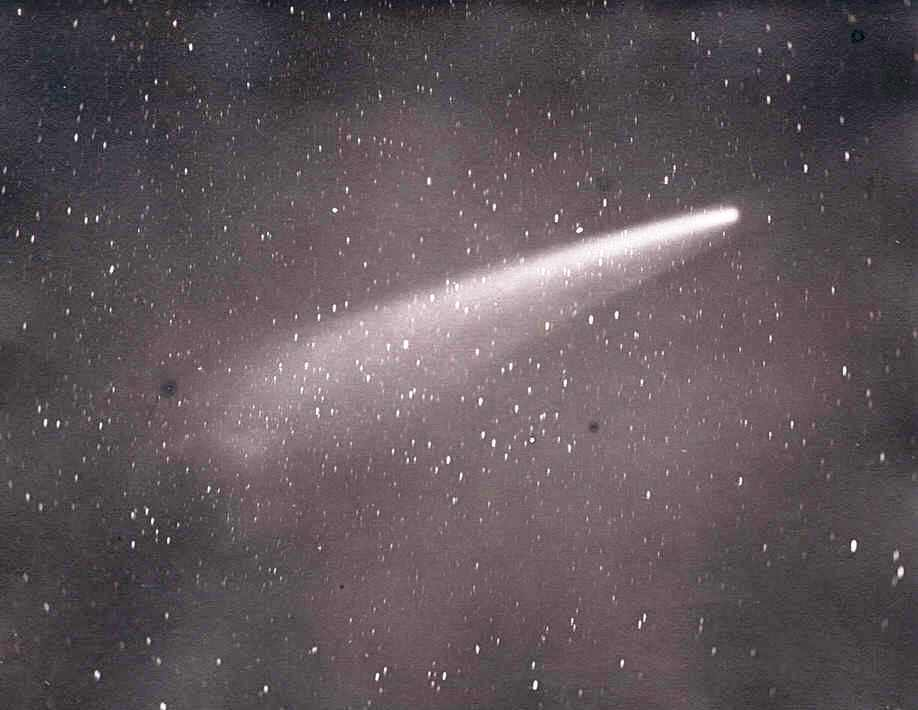
Photograph of Comet 1882b, as seen from Cape Town by David Gill

He made many useful observations including observations of 21 comets, although he never discovered any himself. The transit of Venus on 6 December 1882, which he observed from Fort Selwyn, near Grahamstown was one of the highlights of his observational career. He was assisted in this observation by the mayor of Grahamstown, J.S. Willcox, a jeweler who provided a chronometer with which to time the observations. Two astronomers at the Royal Observatory in Cape Town, D. Gill and W.H. Finlay sent a series of telegraphed time signals to Eddie which allowed him to correct the chronometer.

Over the 20 years of his career, some of his results were published in seven papers in the Monthly Notices of the Royal Astronomical Society, including an extensive series of observations of Comet 1882b.

He published several other papers in other journals, such as his observation on the lunar eclipse of 11 March 1895 in Popular Astronomy and a curious meteor trail seen at Grahamstown on 22 October 1895, also published in Popular Astronomy. His contributions to the Journal of the British Astronomical Association included notes on a brilliant meteor and the colours and spectra of 100 southern stars in 1894 and the conjunction of the moon with Venus in 1903. He observed a transit of Mercury in 1894 and in 1907 he studied the planet Mars with great detail and published drawings that were highly acclaimed by E. M. Antoniadi of the Mars section of the British Astronomical Association.

He was elected a fellow of the Royal Astronomical Society on 14 May 1880. From 1881 to 1898 he regularly published his observations of comets in the local newspaper, the Grahamstown Journal, including observations of Fabry's comet (1886), Swift's Comet (1892) and Gale's Comet (1894).

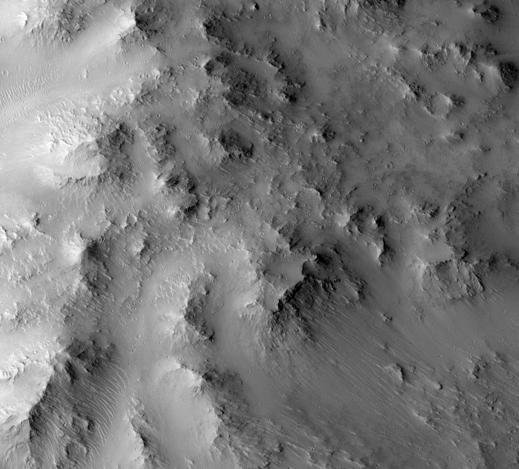
Eddie Crater central peak on mars

The Eddie crater on Mars is an 89 kilometer wide crater named in his honour.

== Selected publications ==
- Eddie, L.A. (1886) "Observations of Fabry's comet" Monthly Notices of the Royal Astronomical Society
- Eddie, L.A. (1888) "The southern comet; observations made at Graham's Town, Cape of Good Hope" Monthly Notices of the Royal Astronomical Society
- Eddie, L.A. (1895) "Observations of the transit of Mercury, 1894" Monthly Notices of the Royal Astronomical Society
- Eddie, L.A. (1899) "Observations of Swift's comet, 1899" Monthly Notices of the Royal Astronomical Society
- Eddie, L.A. (1899) "Tempel's comet (1873 II-c, 1899)" Monthly Notices of the Royal Astronomical Society

== See also ==
- List of hyperbolic comets
