= Eddie (crater) =

Martian crater

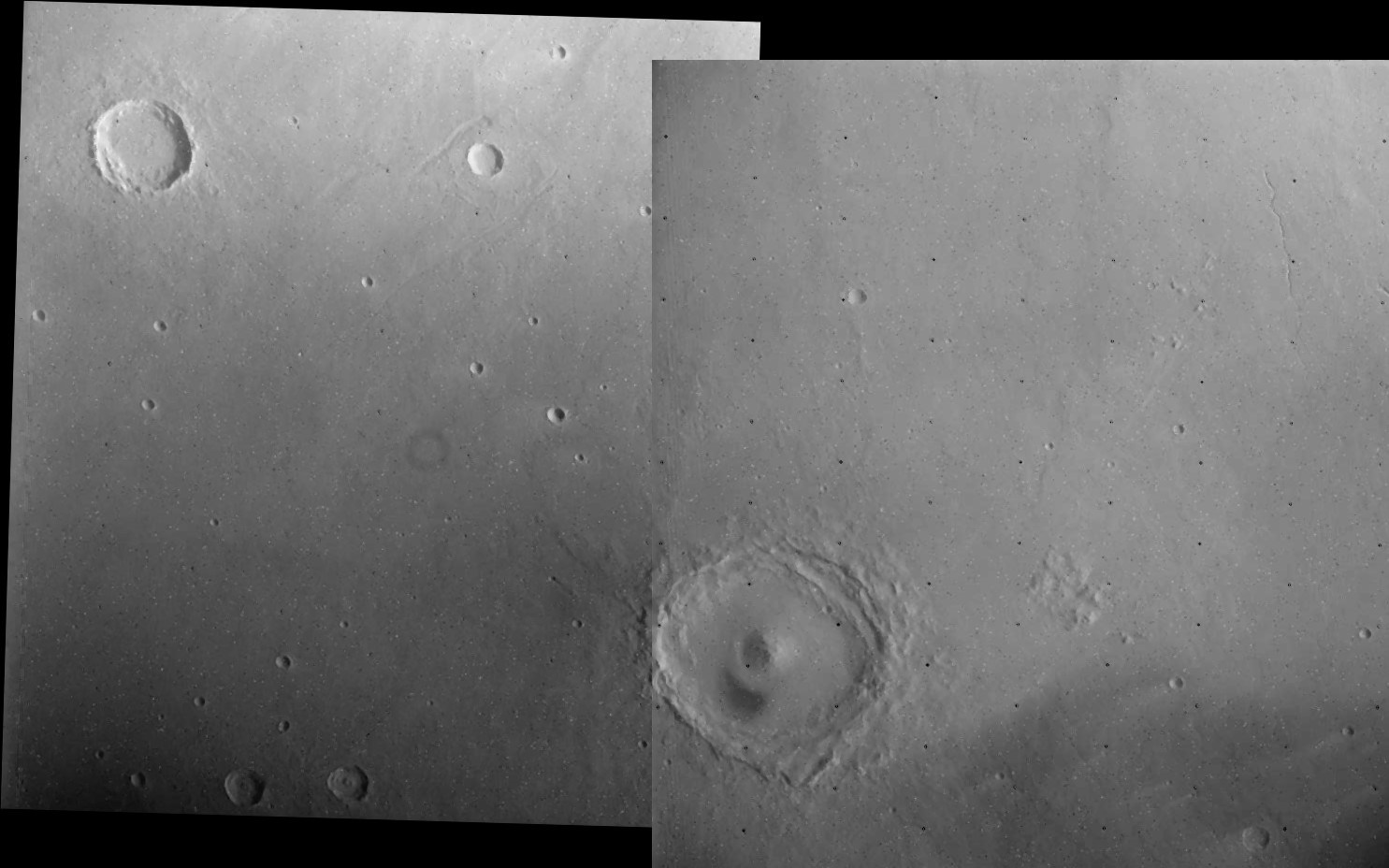
- Viking Orbiter 1 mosaic
- Planet: Mars
- Coordinates: 12.3°N 217.9°W
- Quadrangle: Elysium
- Diameter: 89 km
- Eponym: Lindsay Eddie, a South African astronomer (1845-1913)

Eddie is a crater in the Elysium quadrangle of Mars. It is 89 km in diameter and was named after Lindsay Eddie, a South African astronomer (1845–1913).

Impact craters generally have a rim with ejecta around them, in contrast volcanic craters usually do not have a rim or ejecta deposits. As craters get larger (greater than 10 km in diameter) they usually have a central peak, as this crater has. The peak is caused by a rebound of the crater floor following the impact. It contains material uplifted from beneath the surface.

The InSight Mars lander landed south and west of Eddie crater in 2018.

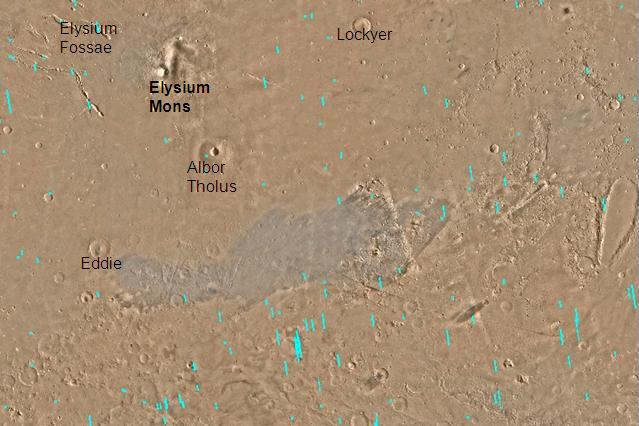
Map of Elysium quadrangle. Elysium Mons and Albor Tholus are large volcanoes. Eddie crater is at the left.

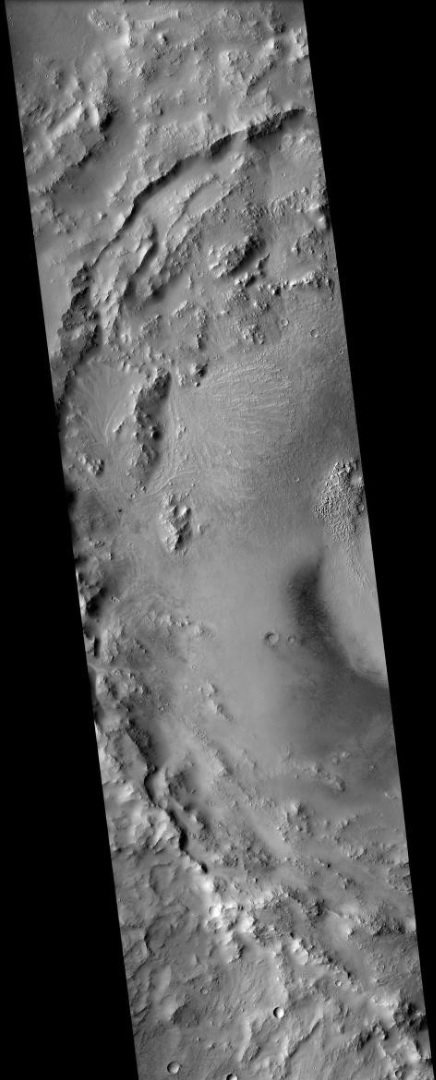
Eddie crater, as seen by CTX camera on MRO

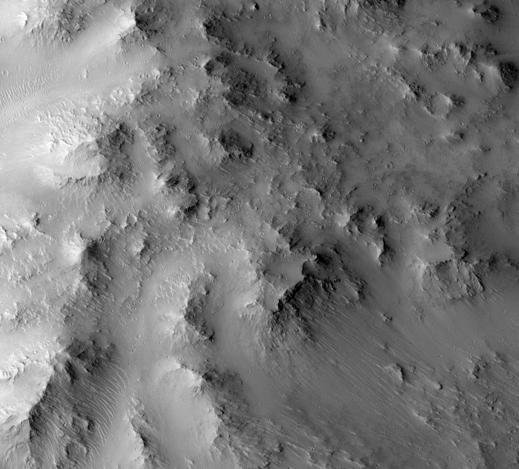
Central peak of Eddie crater, as seen by HiRISE.

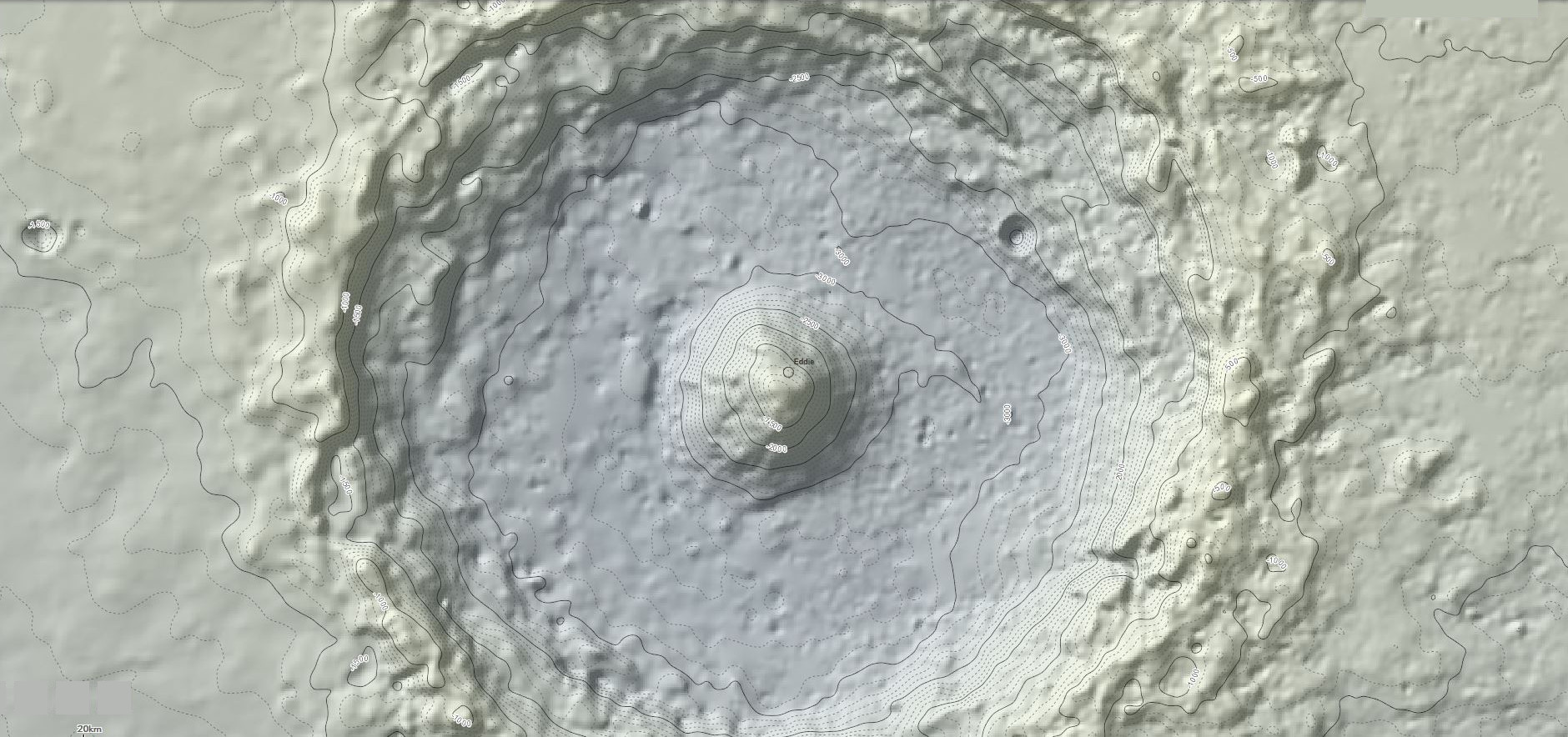
A topographic map using Mars Orbiter Laser Altimeter (MOLA) data. This map shows the elevation of the rim and central peak of Eddie crater relative to Mars' areoid.

== See also ==
- Impact crater
- Impact event
- List of craters on Mars
- Ore resources on Mars
- Planetary nomenclature
