= Grindavik (crater) =

Crater on Mars

- Grindavik Crater, as seen by HiRISE. Scale bar is 1000 meters long.
- Planet: Mars
- Coordinates: 25.39°N 39.07°W
- Quadrangle: Oxia Palus
- Diameter: 12 km
- Eponym: Grindavík, Iceland

Grindavik is an impact crater in the Oxia Palus quadrangle of Mars, located at 25.39° North and 39.07° West. It is 12 km (7.5 mi) in diameter and was named after Grindavík, a town in Iceland. Impact craters generally have a rim with ejecta around them, in contrast volcanic craters usually do not have a rim or ejecta deposits. As craters get larger (greater than 10 km or 6.2 mi in diameter) they usually have a central peak. The peak is caused by a rebound of the crater floor following the impact.

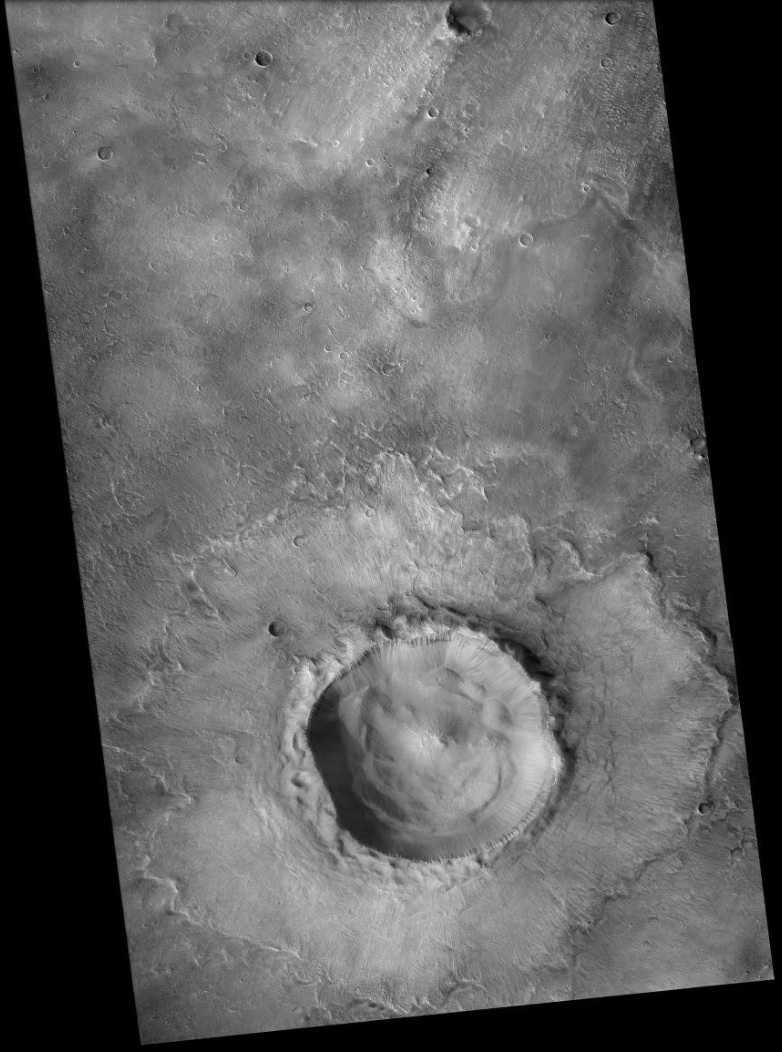
Grindavik Crater, as seen by CTX camera (on Mars Reconnaissance Orbiter).

== See also ==
- List of craters on Mars
