= Jean-Claude Briault =

New Caledonian politician

Jean-Claude Briault (born 21 August 1947 in Nouméa) is a New Caledonian politician. He has served in the Congress of New Caledonia as a member of The Rally-UMP.
