= Maurice du Martheray =

Swiss physician, amateur astronomer and poet

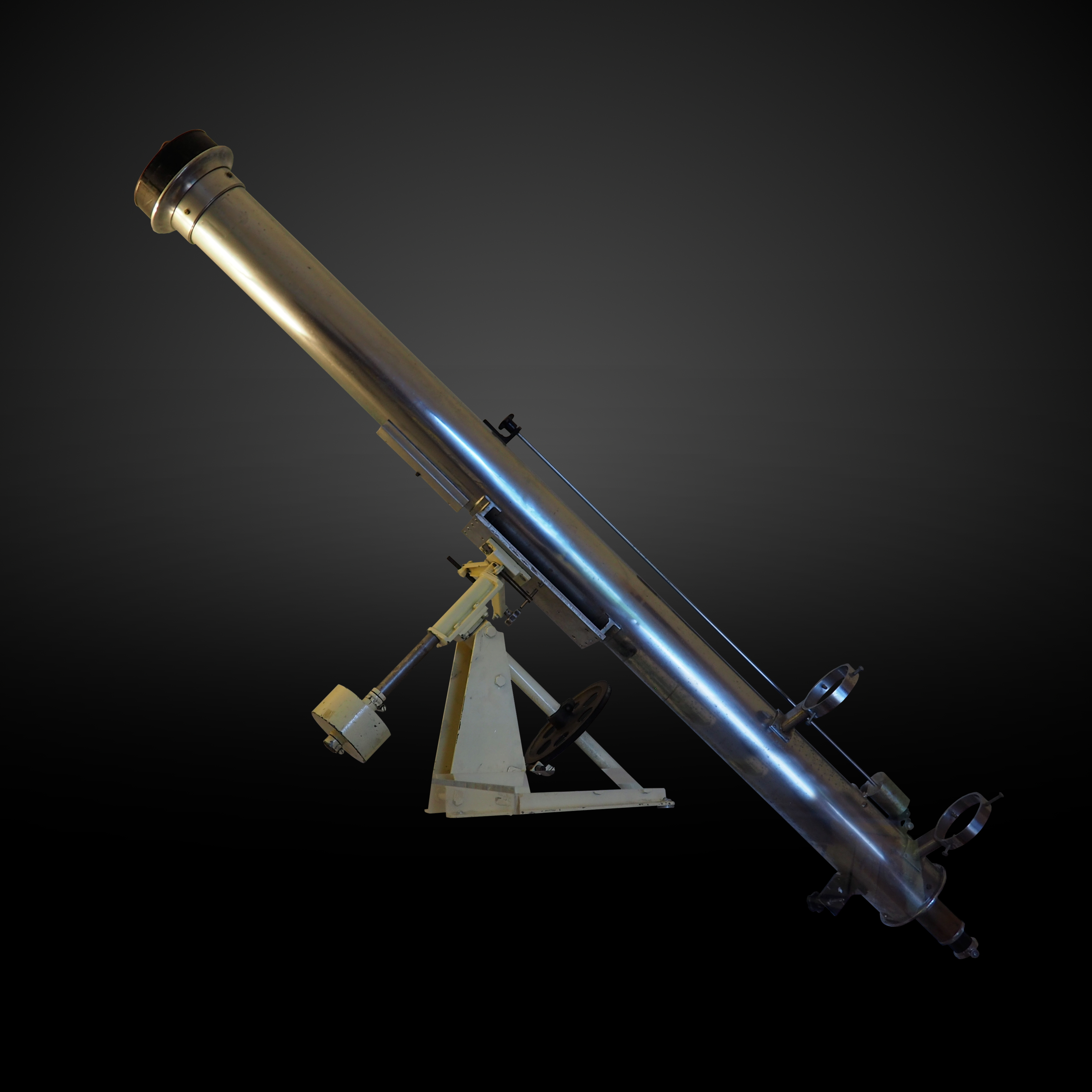
Telescope on display at Musée d'histoire des sciences de la Ville de Genève, probably the one used by du Martheray from 1924.

Maurice du Martheray (1892 – 12 April 1955) was a Swiss physician, amateur astronomer and poet. According to a eulogy published by the Swiss Astronomy Club of Geneva, he was a passionate astronomer ever since becoming a member on 2 February 1910. After graduating as a physician and getting married, he co-founded the Flammarion Astronomical Society of Geneva with Jean-Henri Jehéber and Ami Gandillon in 1923. For the following 32 years, he would passionately develop the activities of the society as secretary general, sometimes even at the expense of his career as a dental surgeon. Maurice du Martheray died suddenly on 12 April 1955 and is resting in the cemetery of Nyon, his birthplace, on the shore of Lake Leman in Switzerland.

During his over 40 years of observations he produced more than 20,000 high resolution pictures of the Sun, and more than 10,000 pictures of the Moon and the planets. After the Swiss Astronomical Society was created in Bern in November 1938, Maurice du Martheray co-edited the first issue of its magazine, ORION with Max Schürer, Privat Dozent at the University of Bern and later Professor of astronomy and director of the Astronomical Institute of the same university; with the serious amateur and producer of the almanac Der Sternenhimmel Robert A. Naef of Zürich; and with Emile Antonin of Geneva. Astronaut Claude Nicollier carried a copy of that issue in the space shuttle Endeavour in December 1993 during the first Hubble Space Telescope servicing mission.

A crater on Mars was named in his honor by NASA in 1973.

== Sources and References ==
Notes

References

- Revue des Constellations Pages II et III de la Couverture
