= Bacolor (crater) =

Crater on Mars

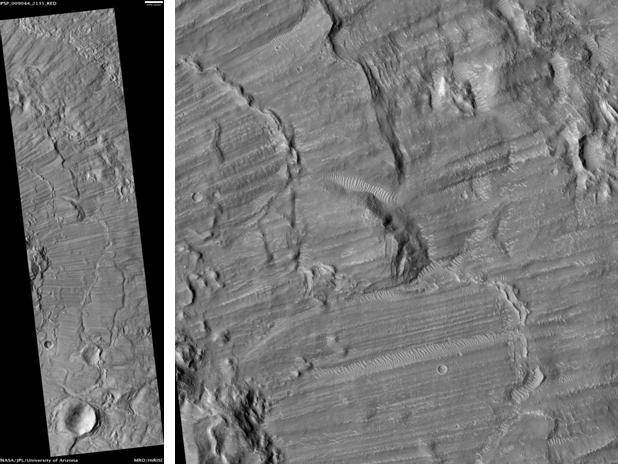
- Bacolor Crater Ejecta, as seen by HiRISE. Scale bar is 1 kilometer long.
- Planet: Mars
- Coordinates: 33°N 241.4°W
- Quadrangle: Casius
- Diameter: 20.8 km
- Eponym: Bacolor, Pampanga, Philippines

Bacolor is a crater in the Casius quadrangle of Mars, located at 33 North and 241.4 West. 20.8 kilometers (12.9 mi) in diameter, it is named after the municipality of Bacolor in Pampanga, Philippines.

The crater shows a double layer of ejecta. The impact's heat vaporized the ground and any ice where the meteorite struck. Shock waves spread outward from the impact point, smashing rocks and heaving the fragments skyward, along with steam and other hot gases. As the shock wave dug deeper, it excavated a bowl-shaped hole in the ground. A thick, hot, slurry of mud, water vapor, and rock fragments flew away from the growing cavity and fell to the ground, making the inner ejecta apron. The innermost portion of this layer covered the ground thickly and, near the crater rim, shows numerous signs of having flowed at least sluggishly.

== Gallery ==
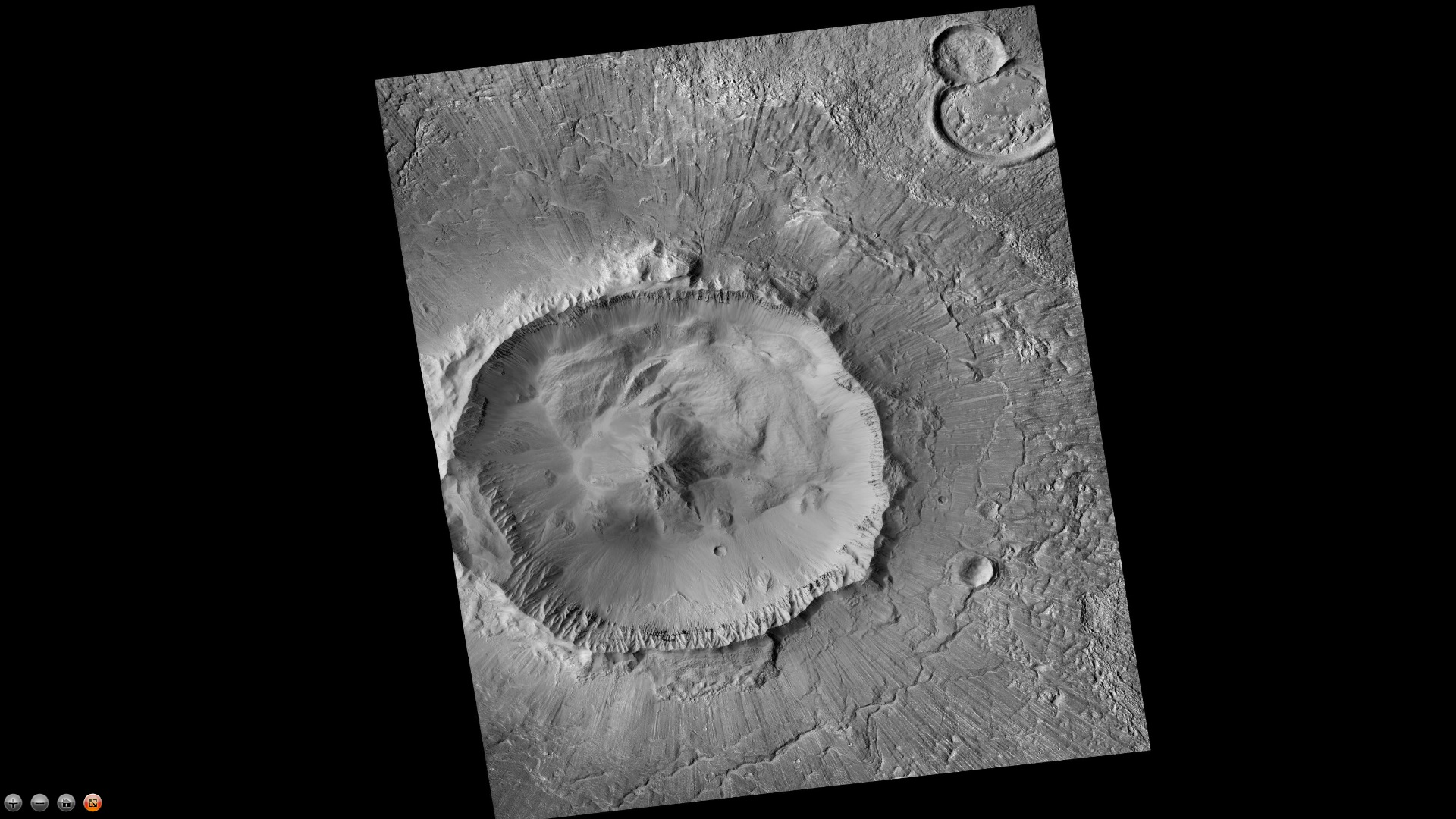
Bacolor Crater, as seen by CTX

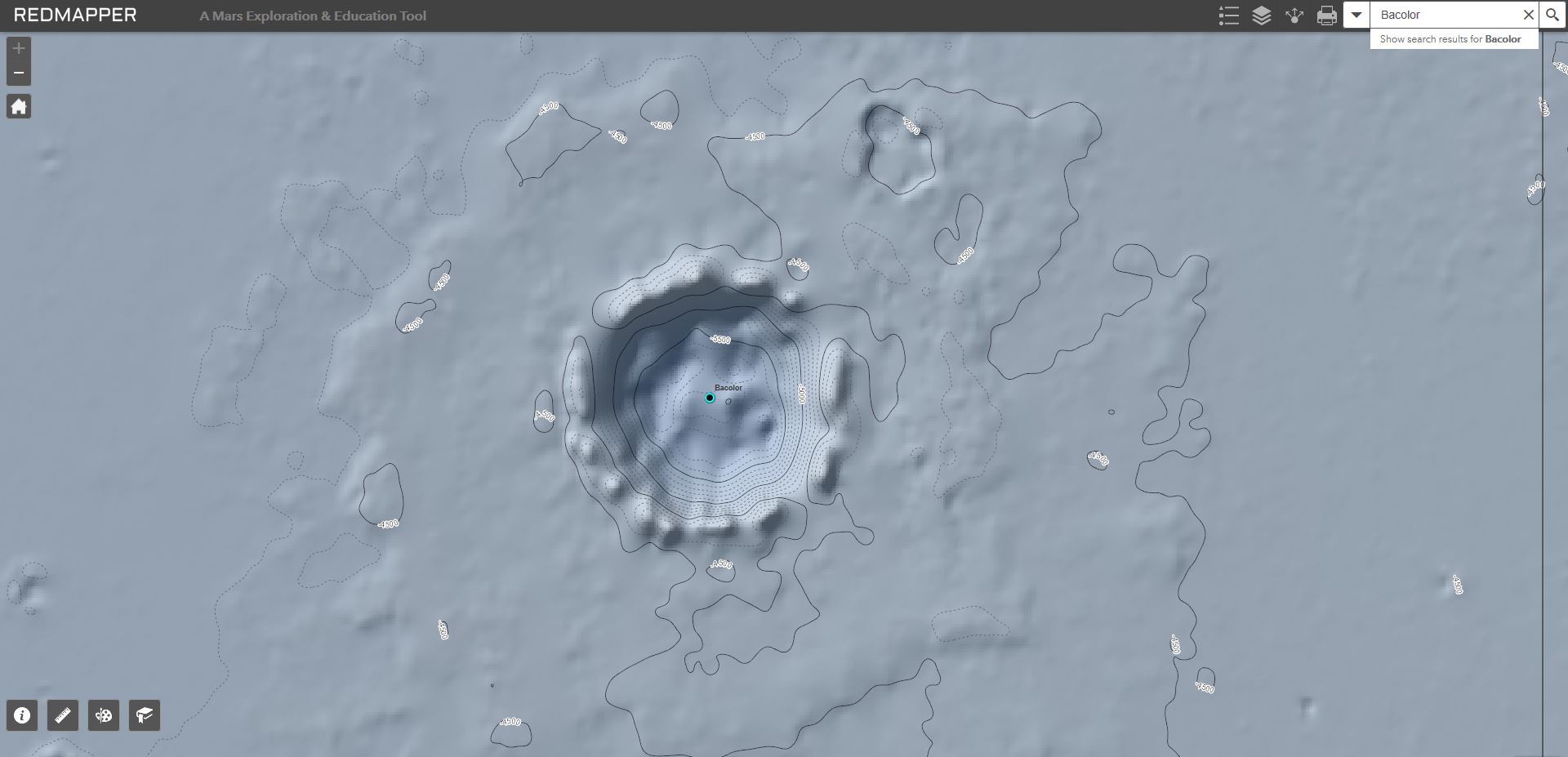
Bacolor crater's rim sits 4,200 meters below areoid (Mars' mean elevation analogous to sea level on earth) and the bottom is 5,800 meters below areoid.

== See also ==
- Casius quadrangle
- Impact crater
- Impact event
- List of craters on Mars
- Ore resources on Mars
- Planetary nomenclature
