= Baltisk (crater) =

Crater on Mars

Crater characteristics
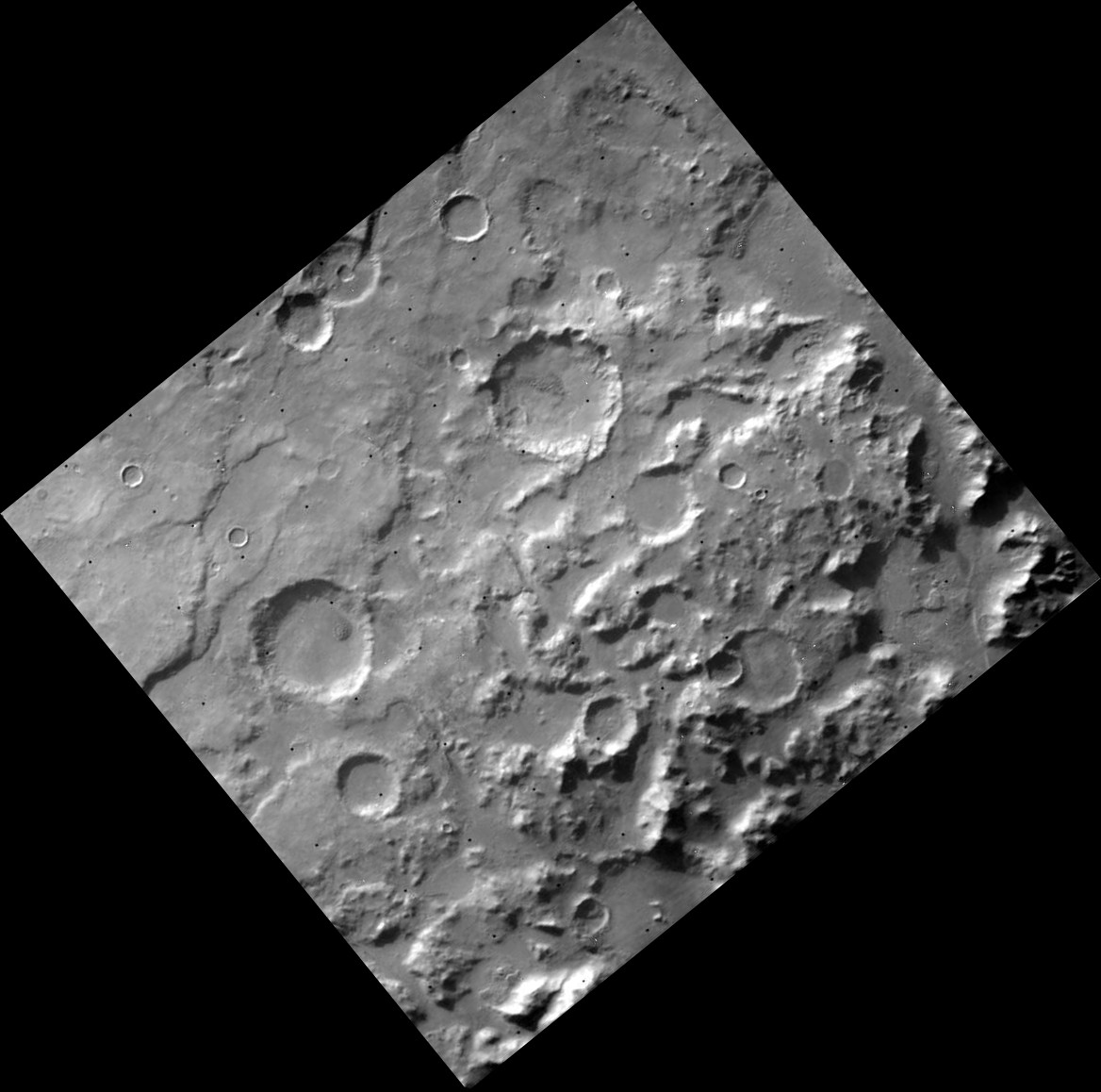
- Viking Orbiter 1 image with Baltisk crater above center
- Planet: Mars
- Coordinates: 42.27°S 305.34°E
- Quadrangle: Argyre
- Diameter: 50.75 km (31.53 mi)
- Eponym: Baltiysk, Russia

Baltisk is a crater in the Argyre quadrangle of Mars. It was named after a town in Russia in 1976. Baltisk is located on the western edge of the Argyre impact basin.

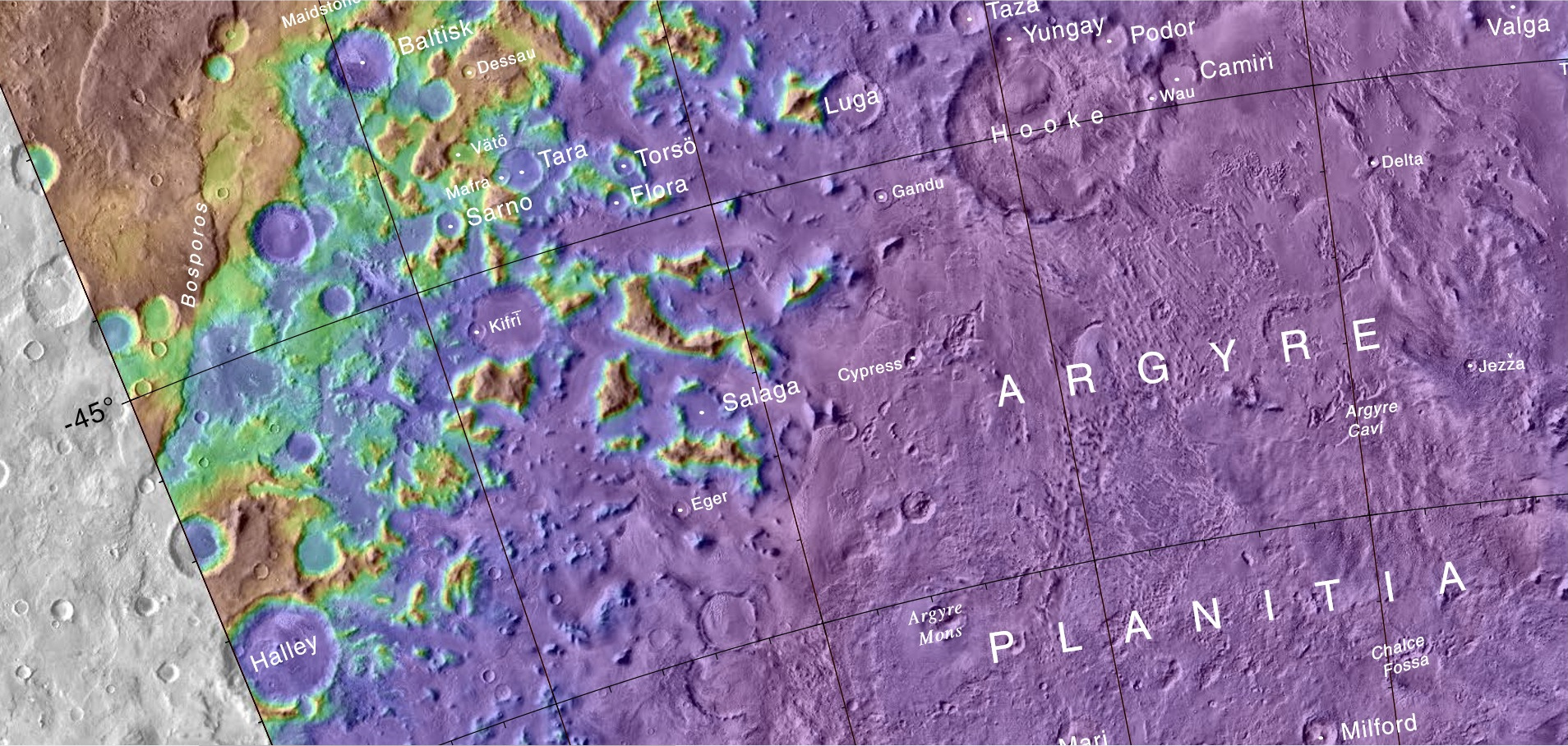
Topo map showing the location of Baltisk crater and other nearby features

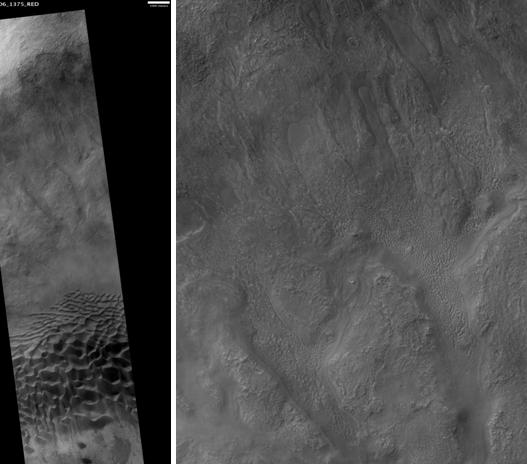
Baltisk crater floor, as seen by HiRISE. Scale bar is 1000 meters long. Dark dunes are visible at the bottom of image on the left.

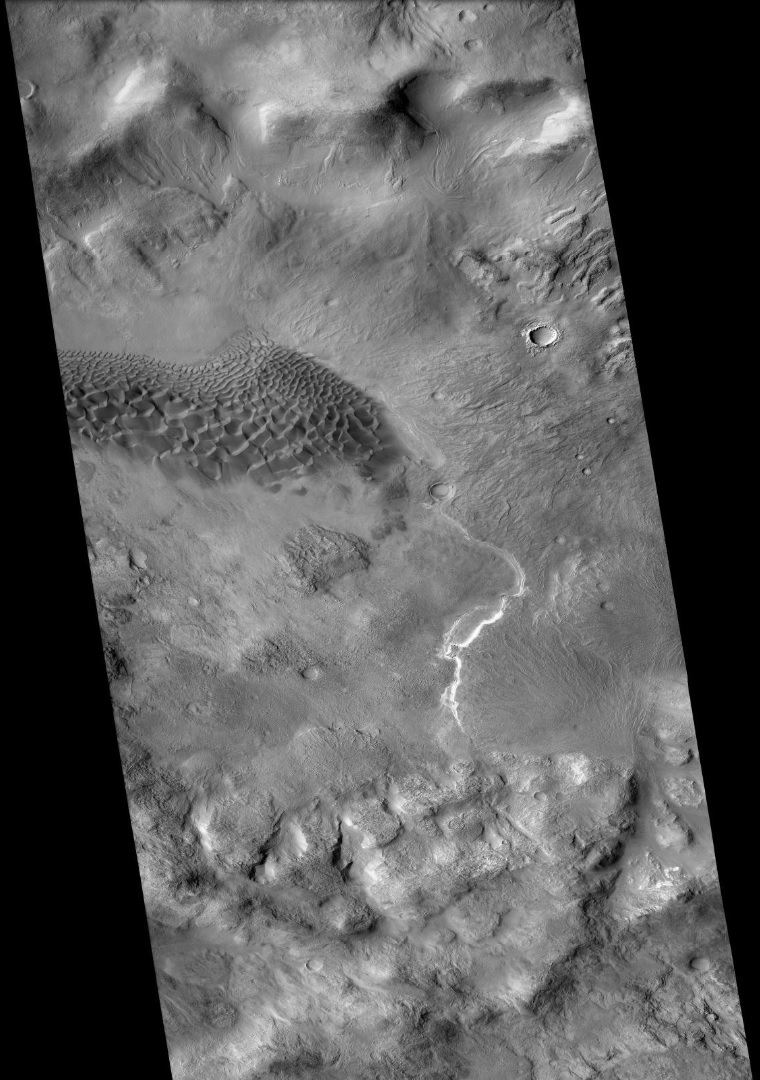
Baltisk crater, as seen by CTX camera on MRO. Dark areas are dunes. Fans are visible in the lower right.

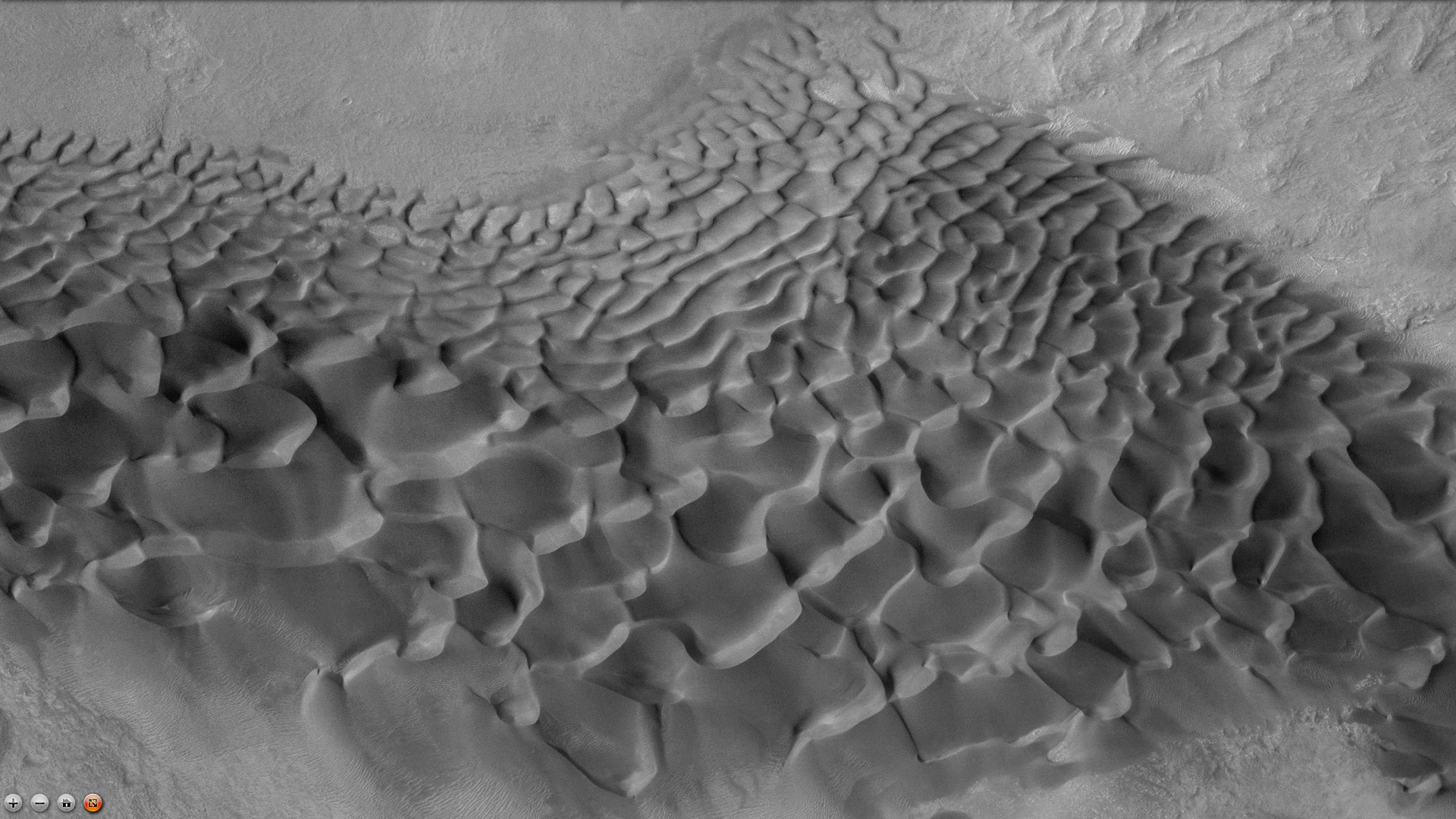
Dunes in Baltisk crater, as seen by CTX camera. Note: this is an enlargement of a previous image.

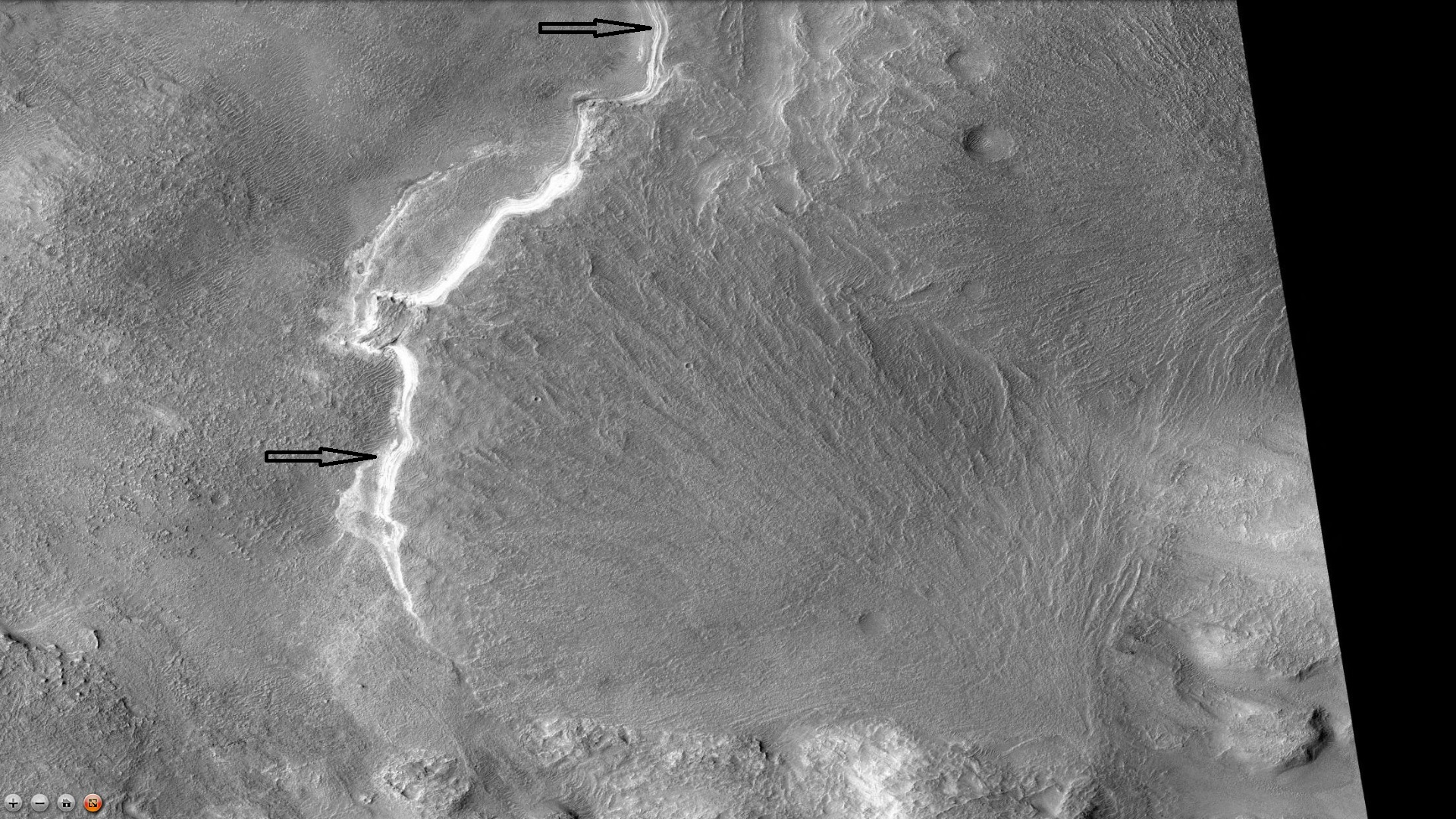
Fans in Baltisk crater, as seen by CTX camera. Note: this is an enlargement of a previous image. Arrows point to layered parts of the fans.

Impact craters generally have a rim with ejecta around them, in contrast volcanic craters usually do not have a rim or ejecta deposits. As craters get larger (greater than 10 km in diameter) they usually have a central peak. The peak is caused by a rebound of the crater floor following the impact.

== See also ==
- Argyre quadrangle
- Climate of Mars
- Impact crater
- List of craters on Mars
- Ore resources on Mars
- Planetary nomenclature
- Water on Mars
