= P. Briault =

French astronomer

Paul Briault was a French astronomer.

Between 1916 and 1918 he observed the surface features of Mercury and published his maps as one of the first available at the time.

A crater on Mars was named in his honor.
