= Otto Boeddicker =

German astronomer

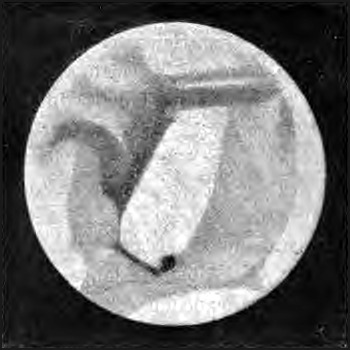
Mars, as seen by Boeddicker, 1881

Otto Boeddicker (1853–1937) was a German astronomer. In 1880 he became the astronomical assistant of Lawrence Parsons, 4th Earl of Rosse at Birr Castle in Birr, Ireland, and remained in that position until the death of the Earl in 1908.

He published drawings of naked-eye observations of the Milky Way in 1892, made over a period of six years. He also observed the Moon, including the emitted heat during the total lunar eclipse of 28 January 1888. His drawings of Jupiter were published in the Scientific Transactions of the Royal Dublin Society in 1889. His drawings of Mars were published in La planète Mars by Camille Flammarion.

He left for Germany in 1916 after being designated an enemy alien.

A crater on Mars is named in his honor.
