= List of craters on Mars: H–N =

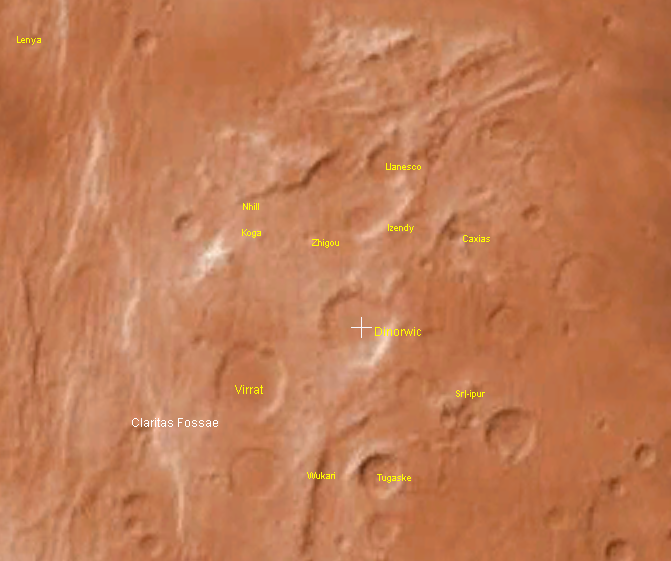
The crater Nhill and its surroundings, in a screenshot in NASA World Wind

This is a partial list of craters on Mars. There are hundreds of thousands of impact craters on Mars, but only some of them have names. This list here only contains named Martian craters starting with the letter H – N (see also lists for A – G and O – Z).

Large Martian craters (greater than 60 kilometers in diameter) are named after famous scientists and science fiction authors; smaller ones (less than 60 km in diameter) get their names from towns on Earth. Craters cannot be named for living people, and small crater names are not intended to be commemorative – that is, a small crater isn't named after a specific town on Earth, but rather its name comes at random from a pool of terrestrial place names, with some exceptions made for craters near landing sites. Latitude and longitude are given as planetographic coordinates with west longitude.

== H ==
Crater	Coordinates	Diameter (km)	Approval date	Named after	Refs
Hack	27.86°N 11.48°W	69.0	2025	Margherita Hack	WGPSN
Hadley	19.5°S 203.1°W	119.0	1973	George Hadley	WGPSN
Hala	37.17°S 190.82°W	21.0	2025	Town in Pakistan	WGPSN
Halba	26.3°S 56.1°W	31.4	2013	Halba, Lebanon place name	WGPSN
Haldane	53.1°S 230.9°W	78.7	1973	J. B. S. Haldane	WGPSN
Hale	36.1°S 36.5°W	149.0	1973	George Ellery Hale	WGPSN
Halley	48.7°S 59.3°W	84.5	1973	Edmond Halley	WGPSN
Ham	45.0°S 32.6°W	1.8	1976	France place name	WGPSN
Hamaguir	49.0°N 227.6°W	0.5	1979	Hammaguir, Algeria	WGPSN
Hamelin	20.5°N 32.8°W	9.6	1976	Hamelin, Germany	WGPSN
Handlová	38.0°N 88.7°W	4.6	1991	Slovakia place name	WGPSN
Harad̦	27.7°S 28.1°W	8.0	1976	Saudi Arabia place name	WGPSN
Hargraves	20.76°N 284.36°W	68.0	2006	Robert B. Hargraves	WGPSN
Harris	21.88°S 293.27°W	83	2010	Daniel Lester Harris	WGPSN
Hartwell	18.53°N 77.72°E	1.7	2020	Hartwell, Georgia	WGPSN
Hartwig	39.0°S 16.0°W	105.0	1973	Ernst Hartwig	WGPSN
Hashir	3.21°N 275.04°W	16.5	2006	Pervari, Siirt (old name), Turkey	WGPSN
Heaviside	70.7°S 95.3°W	87.4	1973	Oliver Heaviside	WGPSN
Heimdal	68.52°N 124.73°W	11.5	2008	Heimdal, Norway	WGPSN
Heinlein	64.8°S 243.8°W	88.0	1994	Robert A. Heinlein	WGPSN
Helmholtz	45.8°S 21.3°W	111.5	1973	Hermann von Helmholtz	WGPSN
Henbury	63.76°S 147.87°W	27.0	2007	Henbury Crater, Australia	WGPSN
Henry	10.9°N 336.7°W	171.0	1973	Paul Henry and Prosper Henry	WGPSN
Henry Moore	59.73°S 306.24°W	66.1	2006	Henry J. Moore, American astrogeologist	WGPSN
Herculaneum	19.5°N 58.7°W	35.4	1988	Italy place name	WGPSN
Herschel	14.9°S 230.3°W	304.5	1973	William Herschel	WGPSN
Hipparchus	44.8°S 151.4°W	93.0	1973	Hipparchus	WGPSN
Hīt	47.4°N 221.7°W	7.3	1979	Iraq place name	WGPSN
Holden	26.0°S 34.0°W	153.8	1973	Edward S. Holden	WGPSN
Holmes	75.0°S 293.2°W	122.0	1973	Arthur Holmes	WGPSN
Honda	22.6°S 16.4°W	9.1	1976	Colombia place name	WGPSN
Hooke	45.2°S 44.4°W	139.0	1973	Robert Hooke	WGPSN
Hope	45.2°N 10.3°W	7.3	1976	Canada (British Columbia) place name	WGPSN
Horowitz	32.04°S 219.36°W	65.7	2009	Norman Horowitz	WGPSN
Houston	48.5°N 224.1°W	1.6	1979	Houston, TX, USA	WGPSN
Hsüanchʻeng	47.0°N 227.4°W	2.0	1979	Xuancheng, China	WGPSN
Huancayo	3.7°S 39.9°W	25.1	1976	Peru place name	WGPSN
Huggins	49.4°S 204.4°W	90.0	1973	William Huggins	WGPSN
Hunten	39.5°S 336.3°W	82.4	2015	Donald Hunten (see Hunten)	WGPSN
Hussey	53.8°S 126.7°W	99.0	1973	William Hussey	WGPSN
Hutton	71.8°S 255.4°W	99.0	1973	James Hutton	WGPSN
Huxley	63.0°S 259.2°W	107.0	1973	Thomas Henry Huxley	WGPSN
Huygens	14.3°S 304.6°W	470.0	1973	Christiaan Huygens	WGPSN

back to top

== I ==
Crater	Coordinates	Diameter (km)	Approval date	Named after	Refs
Iazu	2.69°S 5.2°W	6.8	2006	Romania place name	WGPSN
Ibragimov	25.7°S 59.7°W	86.0	1982	Nadir Baba Ogly Ibragimov	WGPSN
Idah	44.02°S 32.00°W	28.0	2025	Town in Nigeria	WGPSN
Igal	20.3°S 249.2°W	8.6	1991	Hungary place name	WGPSN
Ikej	21.2°N 247.6°W	4.7	1988	Russia place name	WGPSN
Imgr	19.4°N 248.9°W	3.0	1988	Russia place name	WGPSN
Innsbruck	6.5°S 40.0°W	61.1	1976	Innsbruck, Austria	WGPSN
Ins	24.8°N 251.2°W	2.8	1988	Ins Switzerland	WGPSN
Inta	24.6°S 25.2°W	16.2	1976	Inta, Russia	WGPSN
Inuvik	78.7°N 28.6°W	20.5	1988	Inuvik, Canada	WGPSN
Irbit	24.6°S 25.0°W	13.3	1976	Irbit, Russia	WGPSN
Irharen	34.8°N 219.2°W	6.5	1991	Algeria place name	WGPSN
Isil	27.3°S 272.2°W	82.0	1991	Spain place name	WGPSN
Istok	45.4°S 85.8°W	4.8	2014	Kosovo place name	WGPSN
Izamal	3.78°N 1.62°E	57.5	2018	Izamal, Mexico	WGPSN
Izendy	29.2°S 101.5°W	23.5	1991	Russia place name	WGPSN

back to top

== J ==
Crater	Coordinates	Diameter (km)	Approval date	Named after	Refs
Jaisalmer	33.49°N 84.14°E	15	2018	Jaisalmer, India	WGPSN
Jal	26.5°S 28.8°W	5.0	1976	USA (New Mexico) place name	WGPSN
Jama	21.6°N 53.3°W	2.9	1988	Tunisia place name	WGPSN
Jampur	39.0°N 81.7°W	29.0	1991	Pakistan place name	WGPSN
Janssen	2.7°N 322.5°W	158.0	1973	Pierre Janssen	WGPSN
Jarry-Desloges	9.5°S 276.3°W	92.0	1973	René Jarry-Desloges	WGPSN
Jeans	69.8°S 205.9°W	80.2	1973	James Hopwood Jeans	WGPSN
Jen	40.2°N 10.6°W	9.0	1976	Nigeria place name	WGPSN
Jezero	18.41°N 282.38°W	49.0	2007	Bosnia place name	WGPSN
Jezža	48.8°S 38.0°W	9.1	1976	Russia place name	WGPSN
Jiji	8.77°N 358.26°W	21	2018	Jiji Township, Taiwan	WGPSN
Jijiga	25.4°N 54.0°W	17.3	1976	Ethiopia place name	WGPSN
Jodrell	47.8°N 227.8°W	3.0	1979	Jodrell Bank, England, UK	WGPSN
Johannesburg	48.2°N 226.8°W	1.0	1979	Johannesburg, South Africa	WGPSN
Johnstown	9.8°S 51.1°W	3.2	2006	USA (Pennsylvania) place name	WGPSN
Jojutla	81.63°N 169.65°W	19.0	2006	Jojutla, Mexico	WGPSN
Joly	74.7°S 42.7°W	79.9	1973	John Joly	WGPSN
Jones	19.1°S 19.9°W	94.0	1973	Harold Spencer Jones	WGPSN
Jori	28.38°S 83.4°E	31	2018	Town in South Korea	WGPSN
Jörn	27.18°S 283.67°W	20.7	2006	Sweden place name	WGPSN
Jumla	21.3°S 273.6°W	45.0	2006	Nepal place name	WGPSN

back to top

== K ==
Crater	Coordinates	Diameter (km)	Approval date	Named after	Refs
Kachug	18.4°N 252.5°W	4.7	1988	Russia place name	WGPSN
Kagoshima	47.6°N 224.4°W	1.5	1979	Kagoshima, Japan	WGPSN
Kagul	24.0°S 19.1°W	8.5	1976	Moldova place name	WGPSN
Kāid	4.5°S 44.8°W	8.5	1976	Iraq place name	WGPSN
Kaiser	46.6°S 340.9°W	207.0	1973	Frederik Kaiser	WGPSN
Kaj	27.3°S 29.4°W	1.8	1976	Russia place name	WGPSN
Kakori	41.8°S 29.9°W	29.7	1976	Kakori, India	WGPSN
Kaliningrad	48.8°N 225.1°W	1.2	1979	Kaliningrad, Russia	WGPSN
Kalocsa	6.9°N 7.0°W	35.2	2008	Kalocsa, Hungary	WGPSN
Kalpin	8.93°N 141.27°W	52	2018	Town in China	WGPSN
Kamativi	20.7°S 260.1°W	59.0	1991	Zimbabwe place name	WGPSN
Kamloops	53.8°S 32.6°W	65.0	1991	Kamloops, British Columbia, Canada	WGPSN
Kamnik	37.22°S 161.91°W	10.2	2009	Slovenia place name	WGPSN
Kampot	42.1°S 45.7°W	13.0	1976	Kampot, Cambodia	WGPSN
Kanab	27.5°S 19.0°W	15.0	1976	USA (Utah) place name	WGPSN
Kandi	32.73°S 238.0°W	8.5	2009	Benin place name	WGPSN
Kankossa	11.83°S 304.46°E	16.5	2017	Town in Mauritania	WGPSN
Kansk	20.8°S 17.3°W	34.3	1976	Russia place name	WGPSN
Kantang	24.7°S 17.6°W	54.8	1976	Kantang District, Trang, Thailand	WGPSN
Kaporo	0.12°S 14.35°E	42.7	2018	Kaporo, Malawi	WGPSN
Karpinsk	45.9°S 32.2°W	29.8	1976	Russia place name	WGPSN
Karratha	15.69°S 203.60°W	10	2021	Australia place name	WGPSN
Karshi	23.5°S 19.4°W	22.3	1976	Uzbekistan place name	WGPSN
Kartabo	41.2°S 52.5°W	20.0	1976	Guyana place name	WGPSN
Karzok	18.36°N 131.9°W	15.6	2006	Kashmir place name	WGPSN
Kasabi	28.1°S 271.0°W	43.0	1991	Zambia place name	WGPSN
Kashira	27.3°S 18.4°W	68.5	1976	Russia place name	WGPSN
Kasimov	24.9°S 23.0°W	91.3	1976	Russia place name	WGPSN
Kasra	22.2°N 256.4°W	3.6	1988	Tunisia place name	WGPSN
Katoomba	79.11°S 232.33°W	53.0	2006	Australia (New South Wales) place name	WGPSN
Kaup	22.9°N 33.2°W	3.3	1976	Papua New Guinea place name	WGPSN
Kaw	16.6°N 255.8°W	11.2	1976	French Guiana place name	WGPSN
Kayne	15.7°S 186.6°W	34.9	1997	Botswana place name	WGPSN
Keeler	61.0°S 151.3°W	95.0	1973	James Edward Keeler	WGPSN
Kemʼ	45.3°S 33.0°W	3.3	1976	Russia place name	WGPSN
Kenge	16.36°S 102.95°E	6	2018	Kenge, Democratic Republic of the Congo	WGPSN
Kepler	47.1°S 219.1°W	233.0	1973	Johannes Kepler	WGPSN
Keren	21.2°N 22.5°W	28.7	2012	Eritrea place name	WGPSN
Keulʼ	46.3°N 237.9°W	5.9	1979	Russia place name	WGPSN
Khanpur	21.0°N 258.1°W	2.5	1988	Pakistan place name	WGPSN
Kholm	7.3°S 42.1°W	11.6	1976	Russia place name	WGPSN
Khujirt	16.29°S 203.03°W	38	2021	Town in Mongolia	WGPSN
Khurli	21.1°S 247.1°W	8.9	1991	Pakistan place name	WGPSN
Kibuye	29.13°S 178.29°W	7.4	2010	Rwanda place name	WGPSN
Kifrī	46.0°S 54.4°W	15.0	1976	Iraq place name	WGPSN
Kilkhampton	17.52°N 336.7°W	16	2019	Kilkhampton, England	WGPSN
Kilmia	24.04°S 59.48°W	7	2018	Kilmia, Yemen	WGPSN
Kimry	20.4°S 16.4°W	21.6	1976	Russia place name	WGPSN
Kin	20.4°N 33.5°W	8.3	1976	Japan place name	WGPSN
Kinda	26.0°S 105.2°W	14.0	1991	Dem. Rep Congo place name	WGPSN
Kingston	22.3°N 47.1°W	0.7	1979	Kingston, Jamaica	WGPSN
Kinkora	25.2°S 247.2°W	54.3	1991	Kinkora, Canada	WGPSN
Kipini	26.1°N 31.6°W	73.6	1976	Kipini, Kenya	WGPSN
Kirs	26.6°S 19.5°W	3.0	1976	Russia place name	WGPSN
Kirsanov	22.4°S 25.2°W	15.5	1976	Russia place name	WGPSN
Kisambo	34.4°N 89.0°W	15.8	1991	Dem. Rep. Congo place name	WGPSN
Kita	23.0°S 17.2°W	10.2	1976	Mali place name	WGPSN
Knobel	6.7°S 226.8°W	128.6	1973	Edward Knobel	WGPSN
Knudsen	40.67°S 34.50°W	88.0	2025	Jens Martin Knudsen	WGPSN
Koga	29.3°S 103.8°W	19.3	1991	Tanzania place name	WGPSN
Kok	15.8°N 28.1°W	6.3	1976	Malaysia place name	WGPSN
Kong	5.4°S 38.7°W	11.8	1976	Côte d'Ivoire place name	WGPSN
Kontum	32.06°S 67.13°W	22.1	2006	Vietnam place name	WGPSN
Korolev	73.0°N 195.5°W	84.2	1973	Sergei Korolev	WGPSN
Korph	19.6°N 254.6°W	7.5	1988	Russia place name	WGPSN
Koshoba	23.2°N 283.0°W	10.3	2013	Turkmenistan place name	WGPSN
Kotido	1°N 350.89°W	44	2017	Kotido, Uganda	WGPSN
Kotka	19.5°N 190.1°W	19.5	2014	Finland place name	WGPSN
Kourou	47.1°N 227.3°W	2.0	1979	Kourou, French Guiana	WGPSN
Kovalʼsky	30.2°S 141.5°W	309.0	1985	Marian Albertovich Kowalski	WGPSN
Koy	21.7°N 50.5°W	7.1	1988	Russia place name	WGPSN
Krasnoye	36.1°N 216.2°W	6.5	1991	Russia place name	WGPSN
Kribi	43.3°S 43.6°W	13.7	1976	Cameroon place name	WGPSN
Krishtofovich	48.5°S 262.8°W	112.0	1982	Afrikan Nikolaevich Krishtofovich	WGPSN
Krupac	7.79°S 86.01°E	10	2016	Town in the municipality of Pirot, Serbia	WGPSN
Kuba	25.6°S 19.7°W	26.8	1976	Azerbaijan place name	WGPSN
Kufra	40.7°N 239.7°W	37.5	1979	Kufra, Libya	WGPSN
Kufstein	36°S 57.54°W	18.8	2018	Kufstein, Austria	WGPSN
Kuiper	57.4°S 157.3°W	87.0	1976	Gerard Peter Kuiper	WGPSN
Kular	16.6°N 251.9°W	8.1	1988	Kular Range, Yakutia (Russia)	WGPSN
Kumak	35.8°S 68.2°W	15.0	1979	Russia place name	WGPSN
Kumara	43.3°N 231.5°W	12.0	1979	New Zealand place name	WGPSN
Kunes	25.5°S 252.2°W	15.1	1991	Norway place name	WGPSN
Kunowsky	57.1°N 9.7°W	67.4	1973	George K. Kunowsky	WGPSN
Kushva	44.3°S 35.6°W	38.3	1976	Russia place name	WGPSN

back to top

== L ==
Crater	Coordinates	Diameter (km)	Approval date	Named after	Refs
La Paz	21.3°N 49.1°W	0.6	1979	La Paz, Mexico	WGPSN
Labria	35.3°S 48.1°W	54.0	1979	Brazil place name	WGPSN
Lachute	4.3°S 39.8°W	16.1	1976	Canada (Quebec) place name	WGPSN
Laf	48.3°N 6.0°W	3.2	1976	Cameroon place name	WGPSN
Lagarto	50.2°N 8.4°W	19.5	1976	Brazil place name	WGPSN
Lamas	27.3°S 20.7°W	23.2	1976	Peru place name	WGPSN
Lambert	20.2°S 334.7°W	92.0	1973	Johann Heinrich Lambert	WGPSN
Lamont	58.6°S 113.6°W	76.0	1973	Johann von Lamont	WGPSN
Lampland	35.9°S 79.6°W	79.0	1973	Carl Otto Lampland	WGPSN
Land	48.6°N 8.8°W	5.4	1976	USA (Alabama) place name	WGPSN
Langtang	38.5°S 136.0°W	9.8	2016	Nepal place name	WGPSN
Lapri	20.5°N 252.6°W	3.1	1988	Russia place name	WGPSN
Lar	26.1°S 29.1°W	7.0	1979	Iran place name	WGPSN
Lassell	20.9°S 62.5°W	92.0	1973	William Lassell	WGPSN
Lasswitz	9.4°S 221.8°W	111.0	1976	Kurd Lasswitz	WGPSN
Lau	74.4°S 107.8°W	104.9	1973	Hans E. Lau	WGPSN
Laylá	61.35°S 253.0°W	20.8	2007	Saudi Arabia place name	WGPSN
Le Verrier	38.0°S 342.9°W	140.0	1973	Urbain Le Verrier	WGPSN
Lebu	20.5°S 19.5°W	20.0	1976	Chile place name	WGPSN
Lederberg	13.06°N 45.9°W	87.0	2012	Joshua Lederberg	WGPSN
Leighton	3.06°N 302.32°W	69.0	2009	Robert B. Leighton	WGPSN
Lendringsen	42.42°S 24.21°W	21.0	2025	Town in Germany	WGPSN
Leleque	36.8°N 221.9°W	8.4	1991	Argentina place name	WGPSN
Lemgo	42.8°S 34.8°W	16.6	1976	Germany place name	WGPSN
Lenya	27.0°S 106.9°W	15.5	1991	Burma place name	WGPSN
Leuk	24.1°N 55.1°W	3.6	1988	Switzerland place name	WGPSN
Lexington	22.0°N 48.7°W	5.0	1979	Lexington, Massachusetts, USA	WGPSN
Li Fan	47.2°S 153.2°W	104.8	1973	Li Fan	WGPSN
Liais	75.4°S 252.8°W	132.0	1973	Emmanuel Liais	WGPSN
Liberta	35.6°N 55.5°W	25.1	2012	Antigua and Barbuda place name	WGPSN
Libertad	23.3°N 29.5°W	31.0	1976	Venezuela place name	WGPSN
Linpu	18.4°N 246.9°W	18.5	1976	China place name	WGPSN
Lins	15.9°N 29.9°W	6.2	1976	Brazil place name	WGPSN
Lipany	0.22°S 280.33°W	50.1	2011	Slovakia place name	WGPSN
Lipik	38.42°S 248.43°W	56.0	2009	Lipik, Croatia	WGPSN
Lisboa	21.5°N 47.7°W	0.7	1979	Lisbon, Portugal	WGPSN
Lismore	27.05°N 41.72°W	9.0	2006	Ireland place name	WGPSN
Littleton	15.9°N 252.9°W	7.2	1988	USA (Maine) place name	WGPSN
Liu Hsin	53.6°S 171.6°W	137.0	1973	Liu Xin	WGPSN
Livny	27.4°S 29.2°W	9.2	1976	Russia place name	WGPSN
Llanesco	28.5°S 101.2°W	27.0	1991	Spain place name	WGPSN
Locana	3.5°S 38.2°W	6.6	1976	Italy place name	WGPSN
Lockyer	28.0°N 199.5°W	71.0	1973	Norman Lockyer	WGPSN
Lod	21.2°N 31.6°W	7.5	1976	Lod, Israel	WGPSN
Lodwar	55.4°S 43.3°W	16.0	1991	Lodwar, Kenya	WGPSN
Lohse	43.7°S 16.8°W	155.5	1973	Oswald Lohse	WGPSN
Loja	41.5°N 223.9°W	10.4	1979	Loja, Ecuador	WGPSN
Lomela	81.8°S 56.1°W	11.2	1991	Lomela, Democratic Republic of the Congo	WGPSN
Lomonosov	65.2°N 9.2°W	153.0	1973	Mikhail Lomonosov	WGPSN
Lonar	73.21°N 321.73°W	11.3	2007	Lonar, India	WGPSN
Longa	20.9°S 26.0°W	10.4	1976	Longa, Angola	WGPSN
Loon	19.0°S 246.6°W	7.6	1991	Canada (Ontario) place name	WGPSN
López	14.6°S 262.0°W	85	2014	Epidio López	WGPSN
Lorica	20.0°S 28.4°W	67.6	1976	Colombia place name	WGPSN
Los	35.4°S 76.3°W	7.9	1979	Sweden place name	WGPSN
Lota	46.7°N 11.9°W	15.4	1976	Chile place name	WGPSN
Loto	22.1°S 22.5°W	22.4	1976	Dem. Rep. Congo place name	WGPSN
Louth	70.41°N 256.88°W	37.75	2007	Ireland place name	WGPSN
Lowbury	42.7°N 93.1°W	17.9	1991	New Zealand place name	WGPSN
Lowell	52.3°S 81.4°W	203.0	1973	Percival Lowell	WGPSN
Luba	18.3°S 37.0°W	38.3	2013	Equatorial Guinea place name	WGPSN
Lucaya	11.6°S 51.9°W	34.2	2013	Bahamas place name	WGPSN
Luck	17.4°N 37.0°W	7.7	1976	USA (Wisconsin) place name	WGPSN
Luga	44.6°S 47.5°W	45.0	1976	Russia place name	WGPSN
Luki	29.8°S 37.4°W	21.2	1979	Ukraine place name	WGPSN
Luqa	18.22°S 228.27°W	16.5	2010	Malta place name	WGPSN
Lutsk	39.0°N 3.2°W	5.0	1976	Ukraine place name	WGPSN
Luzin	27.3°N 328.8°W	97.0	1976	Nikolai Luzin	WGPSN
Lydda	24.7°N 32.0°W	36.5	1997	Israel place name	WGPSN
Lyell	70.1°S 15.6°W	131.0	1973	Charles Lyell	WGPSN
Lyot	50.8°N 330.7°W	236.0	1973	Bernard Lyot	WGPSN

back to top

== M ==
Crater	Coordinates	Diameter (km)	Approval date	Named after	Refs
Mädler	10.8°S 357.3°W	125.0	1973	Johann Heinrich von Mädler	WGPSN
Madrid	48.8°N 224.6°W	3.5	1979	Madrid, Spain	WGPSN
Mafra	44.4°S 53.2°W	13.0	1976	Brazil place name	WGPSN
Magadi	34.9°S 46.2°W	53.0	1979	Magadi, Kenya	WGPSN
Magelhaens	32.7°S 174.8°W	105.0	1976	Ferdinand Magellan	WGPSN
Maggini	28.0°N 350.6°W	143.0	1973	Mentore Maggini	WGPSN
Mago	16.1°N 254.7°W	2.8	1988	Russia place name	WGPSN
Maidstone	41.9°S 54.3°W	10.0	1976	Maidstone, England	WGPSN
Main	76.6°S 310.9°W	109.0	1973	Rev. Robert Main	WGPSN
Majuro	33.6°S 275.7°W	43.4	2011	Marshall Islands place name	WGPSN
Makhambet	28.42°N 40.55°W	16.0	2006	Kazakhstan place name	WGPSN
Malino	18°N 335.28°E	16	2020	Malino, Indonesia	WGPSN
Mambali	23.51°S 27.03°E	31	2016	Town in Tanzania	WGPSN
Manah	4.7°S 33.7°W	11.2	1976	Oman place name	WGPSN
Mandora	12.3°N 53.7°W	59.4	1988	Mandora, Australia	WGPSN
Manti	3.6°S 37.7°W	16.2	1976	USA (Utah) place name	WGPSN
Manzī	22.4°S 27.5°W	7.2	1976	Burma place name	WGPSN
Maraldi	62.2°S 32.0°W	124.0	1973	Giacomo F. Maraldi	WGPSN
Marbach	17.8°N 249.0°W	25.8	1976	Switzerland place name	WGPSN
Marca	10.1°S 158.3°W	81.0	1985	Peru place name	WGPSN
Mari	52.4°S 45.9°W	41.6	1991	Mari, Syria	WGPSN
Maricourt	53.32°N 71.3°W	9.9	2007	Quebec place name	WGPSN
Mariner	35.1°S 164.5°W	170.0	1967	Mariner 4	WGPSN
Marth	13.0°N 3.5°W	98.4	1973	Albert Marth	WGPSN
Martin	21.41°S 69.33°W	61.4	2006	James Martin	WGPSN
Martynov	30.4°S 36.4°W	61.1	2013	Dmitry Martynov (astronomer)	WGPSN
Martz	35.3°S 215.9°W	97.0	1973	Edwin P. Martz	WGPSN
Marysville	18.13°N 77.18°W	1.85	2020	Town in California	WGPSN
Masursky	12.1°N 32.4°W	117.9	1997	Harold Masursky	WGPSN
Matara	49.62°S 325.48°W	49.4	2009	Sri Lanka place name	WGPSN
Maunder	50.0°S 358.5°W	107.5	1973	Edward Walter Maunder	WGPSN
Mazamba	27.56°S 69.75°W	53.5	2006	Mozambique place name	WGPSN
McCauley	27.35°S 83.23°W	90	2018	John McCauley	WGPSN
McLaughlin	22.1°N 22.5°W	96.2	1973	Dean B. McLaughlin	WGPSN
McMurdo	84.4°S 359.1°W	30.3	2000	McMurdo Station, Antarctica	WGPSN
Medrissa	18.8°N 56.7°W	21.2	1988	Algeria place name	WGPSN
Mega	1.5°S 37.0°W	18.0	1976	Ethiopia place name	WGPSN
Meget	19.1°N 252.8°W	4.6	1988	Russia place name	WGPSN
Mellish	72.8°S 24.0°W	101.7	1994	John E. Mellish	WGPSN
Mellit	7.11°N 1.8°W	23.7	2008	Sudan place name	WGPSN
Melosh	2.44°N 344.03°W	98.0	2024	H. Jay Melosh	WGPSN
Mena	32.4°S 18.8°W	32.5	1979	Russia place name	WGPSN
Mendel	59.1°S 199.0°W	78.6	1973	Gregor Mendel	WGPSN
Mendota	36.1°N 221.7°W	8.9	1991	USA (Illinois) place name	WGPSN
Micoud	50.9°N 343.7°W	51.9	2011	Saint Lucia place name	WGPSN
Mie	48.5°N 220.4°W	104.0	1973	Gustav Mie	WGPSN
Mila	27.4°S 20.8°W	10.6	1976	Algeria place name	WGPSN
Milanković	54.7°N 146.7°W	118.4	1973	Milutin Milanković	WGPSN
Milford	52.8°S 41.5°W	27.3	1991	USA (Utah) place name	WGPSN
Millman	54.3°S 149.8°W	75.0	1994	Peter Millman	WGPSN
Millochau	21.4°S 275.0°W	115.0	1973	Gaston Millochau	WGPSN
Milna	23.46°S 12.31°W	27	2010	Croatia place name	WGPSN
Minami	37.49°S 33.17°W	80.0	2025	Masatsugu Minami	WGPSN
Mirtos	22.3°N 51.8°W	5.8	1988	Greece place name	WGPSN
Mistretta	24.9°S 109.2°W	14.8	1991	Italy place name	WGPSN
Mitchel	67.7°S 283.9°W	138.4	1973	Ormsby M. Mitchel	WGPSN
Miyamoto	2.88°S 7.0°W	160.0	2007	Shotaro Miyamoto	WGPSN
Mliba	39.9°S 272.1°W	13.5	1991	Swaziland place name	WGPSN
Moanda	35.9°S 40.0°W	38.9	2012	Moanda, Gabon	WGPSN
Mohawk	43.2°N 5.4°W	17.5	1976	Mohawk, New York, USA	WGPSN
Mojave	7.5°N 33.1°W	58.5	2006	Mojave, California, USA	WGPSN
Molesworth	27.7°S 210.9°W	181.0	1973	Percy B. Molesworth	WGPSN
Moni	47.0°S 341.2°W	5.4	2015	Cyprus place name	WGPSN
Montevallo	15.4°N 54.4°W	51.9	1988	Montevallo, Alabama, USA	WGPSN
Morella	9.7°S 51.5°W	78.9	2006	Spain place name	WGPSN
Moreux	42.1°N 315.6°W	138.0	1973	Théophile Moreux	WGPSN
Moroz	23.7°S 20.56°W	123.0	2007	Vasily Ivanovich Moroz; Russian planetary scientist (1931–2004).	WGPSN
Moss	19.5°N 250.6°W	9.1	1976	Norway place name	WGPSN
Moyo	51.02°S 20.83°W	48.0	2025	Town in Uganda	WGPSN
Muara	24.6°N 19.3°W	3.8	2013	Brunei place name	WGPSN
Müller	26.0°S 232.3°W	129.0	1973	Hermann J. Müller and Carl H. Müller	WGPSN
Murgoo	23.9°S 22.5°W	24.5	1976	Western Australia place name	WGPSN
Murray	23.29°S 28.06°E	92	2016	Bruce C. Murray; American planetary scientist (1931–2013)	WGPSN
Mut	22.6°N 35.8°W	6.6	1976	Mut, Mersin, Turkey	WGPSN
Mutch	0.6°N 55.3°W	211.0	1985	Thomas A. Mutch	WGPSN

back to top

== N ==
Crater	Coordinates	Diameter (km)	Approval date	Named after	Refs
Naar	23.1°N 42.2°W	11.4	1976	Egypt place name	WGPSN
Naic	24.7°N 252.6°W	8.3	1976	Naic, Philippines	WGPSN
Nain	41.8°N 233.2°W	6.8	1979	Nain, Canada	WGPSN
Naju	45.3°N 237.2°W	8.1	1979	Naju, South Korea	WGPSN
Nako	29.67°S 82.93°W	43	2018	Town in Burkina Faso	WGPSN
Nakusp	24.72°N 35.52°W	7.5	2006	Canada (British Columbia) place name	WGPSN
Nan	26.9°S 20.0°W	1.9	1976	Nan Province, Thailand	WGPSN
Nansen	50.3°S 140.6°W	81.0	1967	Fridtjof Nansen	WGPSN
Nardo	27.8°S 32.9°W	26.6	1976	Italy place name	WGPSN
Naruko	36.25°S 161.81°W	4.4	2008	Naruko, Miyagi	WGPSN
Naryn	14.89°N 236.79°W	3.7	2008	Kyrgyzstan place name	WGPSN
Naukan	21.5°N 30.7°W	8.4	1976	Russia place name	WGPSN
Navan	26.1°S 23.6°W	26.5	1976	Ireland place name	WGPSN
Nazca	31.9°S 266.4°W	15.5	1991	Peru place name	WGPSN
Negele	36.1°S 264.1°W	37.8	1991	Ethiopia place name	WGPSN
Negril	20.1°N 290.6°W	52	2015	Jamaica place name	WGPSN
Neive	23.4°N 253.0°W	2.9	1988	Italy place name	WGPSN
Nema	20.9°N 52.2°W	15.8	1976	Russia place name	WGPSN
Nepa	25.2°S 19.7°W	15.5	1976	Russia place name	WGPSN
Neukum	44.9°S 28.4°W	102	2017	Gerhard Neukum	WGPSN
Never	23.7°N 254.3°W	2.9	1988	Russia place name	WGPSN
Neves	3.4°S 208.7°W	22.1	2013	São Tomé and Príncipe place name	WGPSN
New Bern	21.8°N 49.2°W	0.9	1979	New Bern, North Carolina, USA	WGPSN
New Haven	22.3°N 49.3°W	1.0	1979	New Haven, Connecticut, USA	WGPSN
New Plymouth	15.9°S 184.2°W	33.3	2003	New Plymouth, Idaho, USA	WGPSN
Newcomb	24.4°S 359.0°W	252.0	1973	Simon Newcomb	WGPSN
Newport	22.5°N 49.0°W	1.8	1979	Newport, Rhode Island, USA	WGPSN
Newton	40.8°S 158.1°W	298.0	1973	Isaac Newton	WGPSN
Nhill	29.0°S 103.4°W	22.0	1991	Nhill, Australia	WGPSN
Nicholson	0.2°N 164.6°W	102.5	1973	Seth Barnes Nicholson	WGPSN
Nier	43.1°N 254.0°W	47.0	1997	Alfred O. C. Nier	WGPSN
Niesten	28.3°S 302.3°W	115.0	1973	Louis Niesten	WGPSN
Nif	20.1°N 56.3°W	8.7	1976	Micronesia place name	WGPSN
Nipigon	34.0°N 81.9°W	9.3	1991	Nipigon, Canada	WGPSN
Niquero	38.8°S 166.09°W	10.78	2008	Niquero, Cuba	WGPSN
Nitro	21.5°S 24.0°W	28.7	1976	Nitro, West Virginia, USA	WGPSN
Njesko	35.5°S 275.0°W	28.0	1991	Czechoslovakia place name (now Nýrsko, Czechia)	WGPSN
Noma	25.7°S 24.4°W	42.1	1976	Namibia place name	WGPSN
Noord	19.49°S 11.26°W	7.8	2011	Noord, Aruba	WGPSN
Nordenskiöld	52.7°S 158.9°W	89.0	1982	Adolf Erik Nordenskiöld	WGPSN
Northport	18.7°N 54.6°W	19.5	1988	Northport, Alabama, USA	WGPSN
Novara	25.1°S 10.7°W	86.9	1997	Novara, Italy	WGPSN
Nqutu	38.4°S 190.5°W	21.0	2016	Nqutu, South Africa	WGPSN
Nune	17.7°N 38.8°W	8.6	1976	Mozambique place name	WGPSN
Nutak	17.6°N 30.3°W	11.2	1976	Nutak, Canada	WGPSN
Nybyen	37.02°S 343.34°E	6.2	2016	Town in Norway	WGPSN

back to top

== See also ==
- List of catenae on Mars
- List of craters on Mars
- List of mountains on Mars
