= Burton (crater) =

Crater on Mars

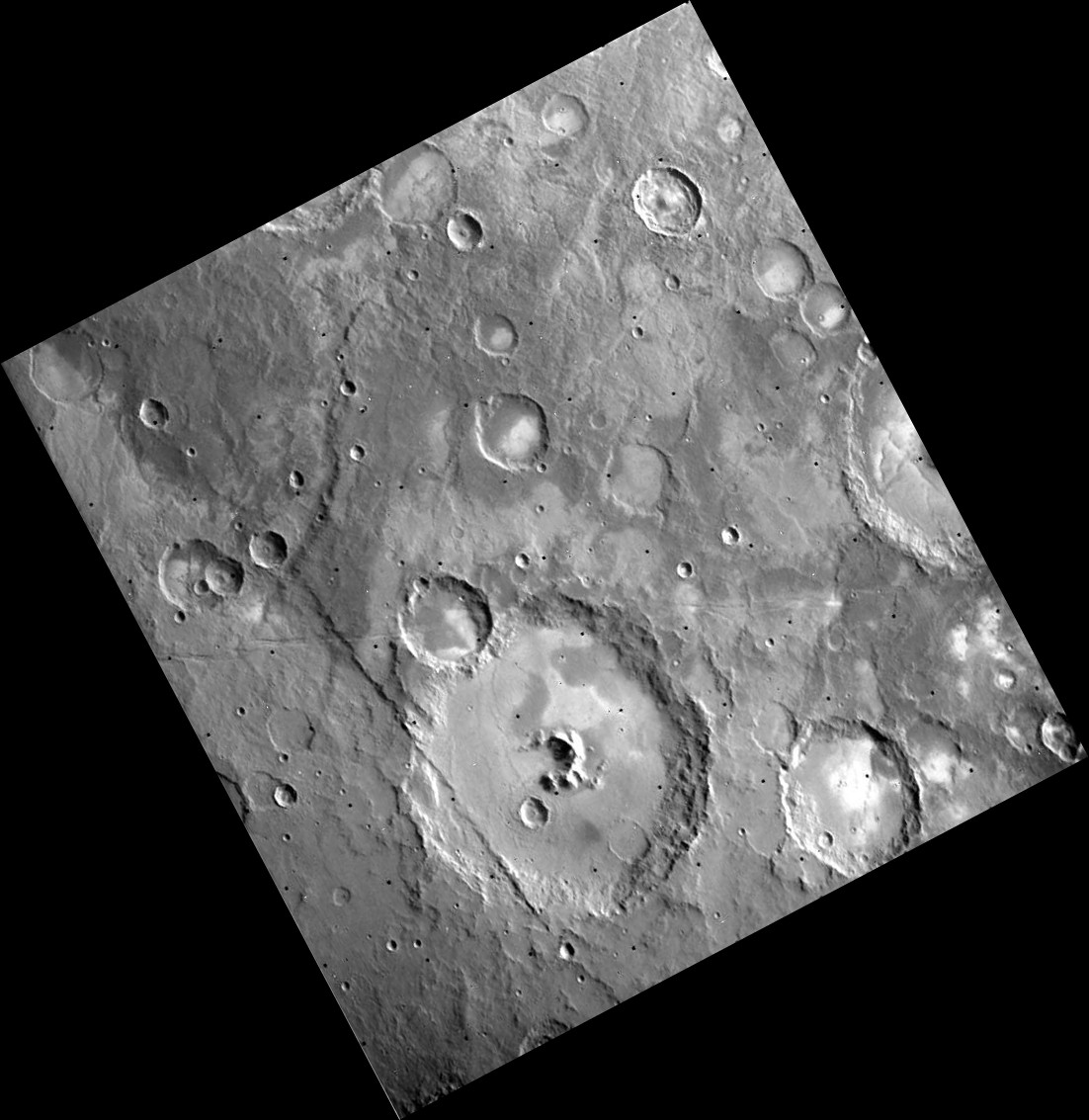
- Viking Orbiter 1 image with Burton at the bottom
- Planet: Mars
- Coordinates: 13.9°S 156.3°W
- Quadrangle: Memnonia
- Diameter: 123.2 km (76.6 mi)
- Eponym: Charles E. Burton

Burton is an impact crater in the Memnonia quadrangle of Mars. It is 123.0 km in diameter and was named after British astronomer Charles E. Burton; the name was approved in 1973.

It has a central peak. Impact craters generally have a rim with ejecta around them, in contrast volcanic craters usually do not have a rim or ejecta deposits. As craters get larger (greater than 10 km in diameter) they usually have a central peak. The peak is caused by a rebound of the crater floor following the impact.

Cobres crater is northeast of Burton, and Marca crater is to the northwest. Mangala Valles is to the east.

In December 2021, three craters immediately south of Burton were named. These are Karratha, Khujirt, and Dampier. Karratha is within Dampier.

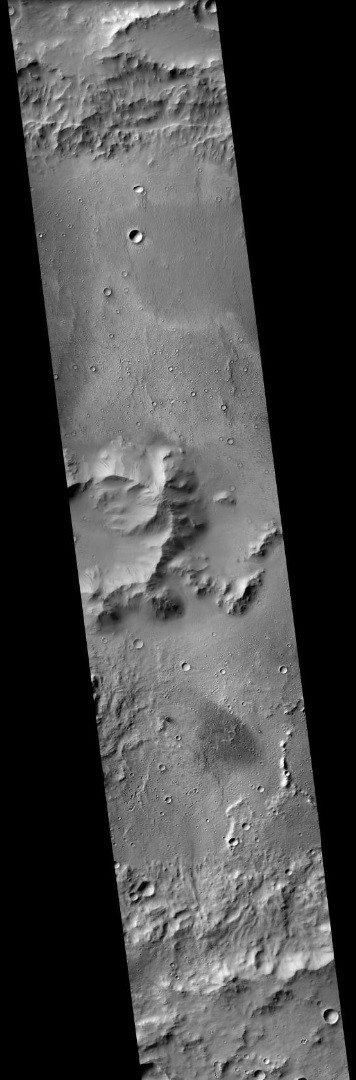
Middle section of Burton crater, as seen by CTX camera (on MRO)

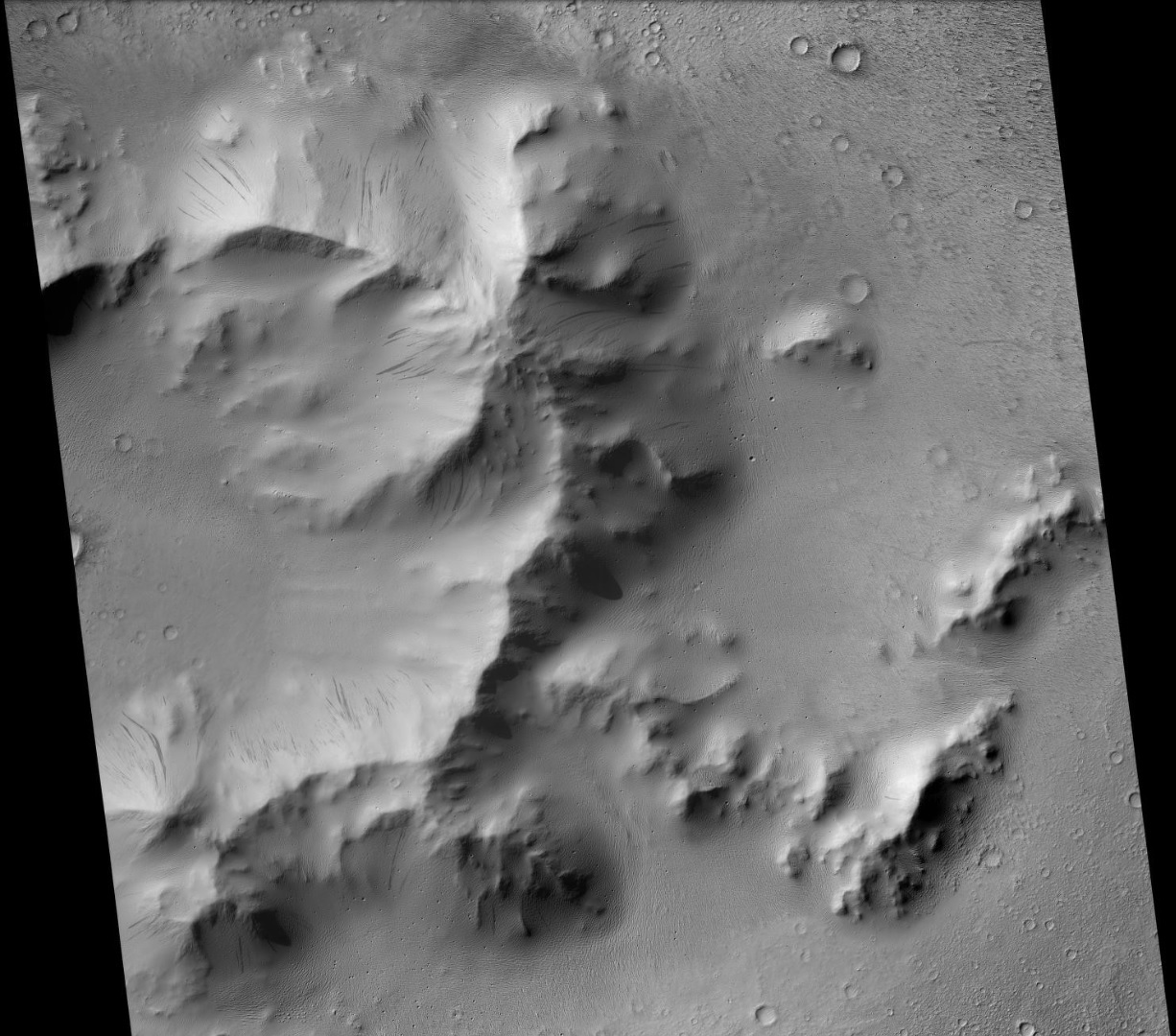
Central peaks of Burton crater, showing dark slope streaks. Note: this is an enlargement of the previous image.

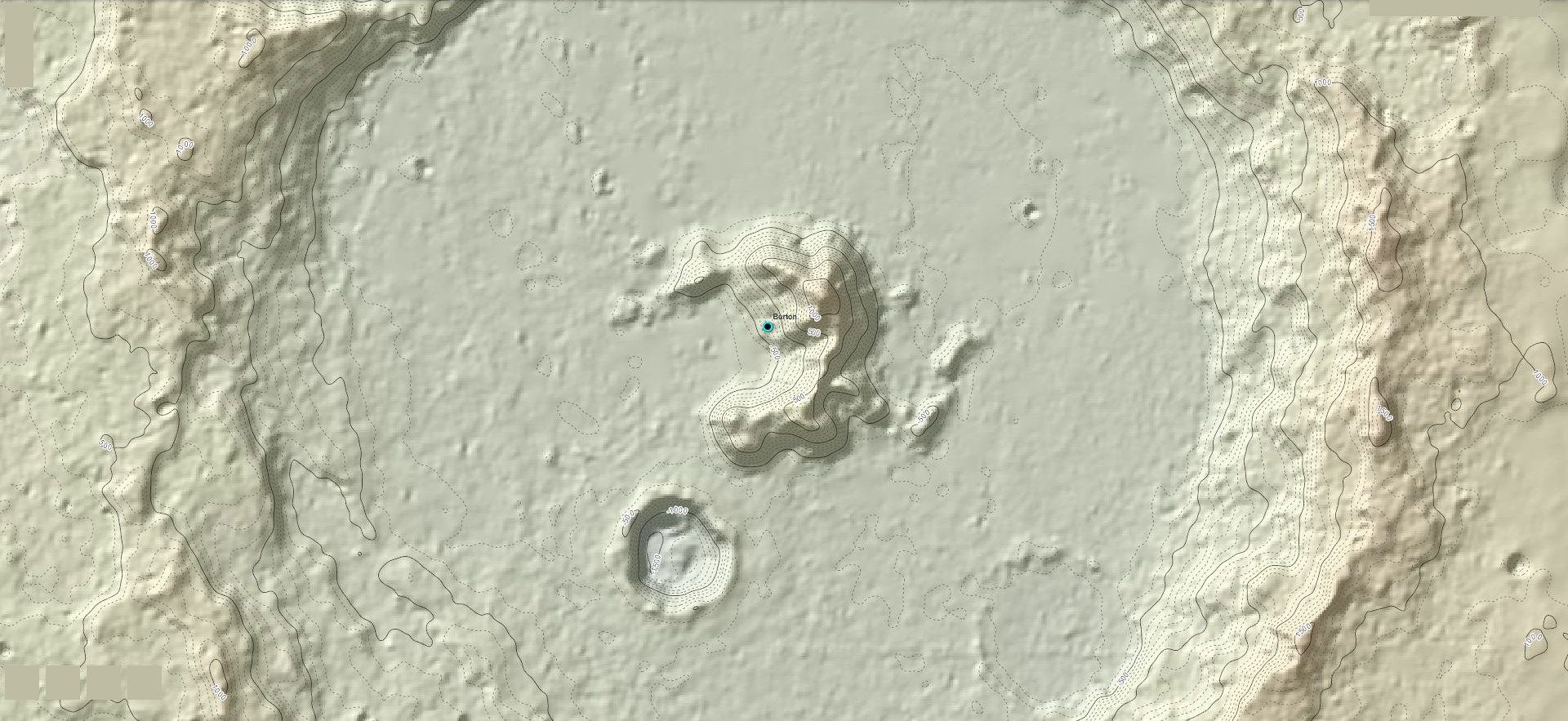
Topographic map showing the central peak

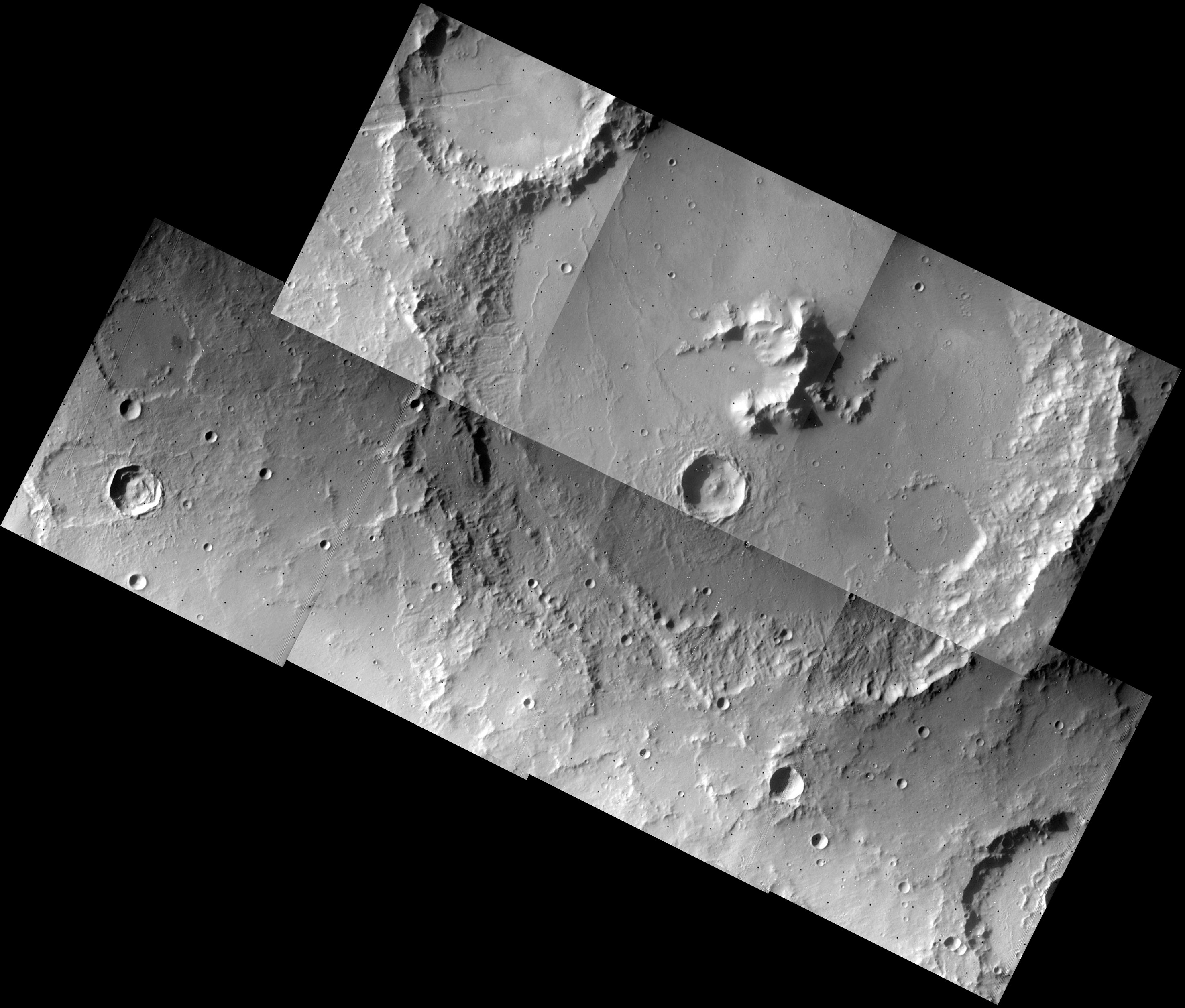
Mosaic of Viking Orbiter 1 images, acquired near the end of the Viking mission in 1980

== Dark slope streaks ==
Many places on Mars show dark streaks on steep slopes like crater walls. It seems that the youngest streaks are dark; they become lighter with age. Often they begin as a small narrow spot then widen and extend downhill for hundreds of meters. They have been seen to travel around obstacles, like boulders. Several ideas have been advanced to explain the streaks. Some involve water or even the growth of organisms. It is most generally accepted that they represent avalanches of dust. The streaks appear in areas covered with dust. When a thin layer of dust is removed, the underlying surface is dark. Much of the Martian surface is covered with dust. Fine dust settles out of the atmosphere covering everything.

Dark streaks can be seen in the image of the central peak above, taken by CTX.

== See also ==
- List of craters on Mars
