= Dampier (crater) =

Impact crater on Mars

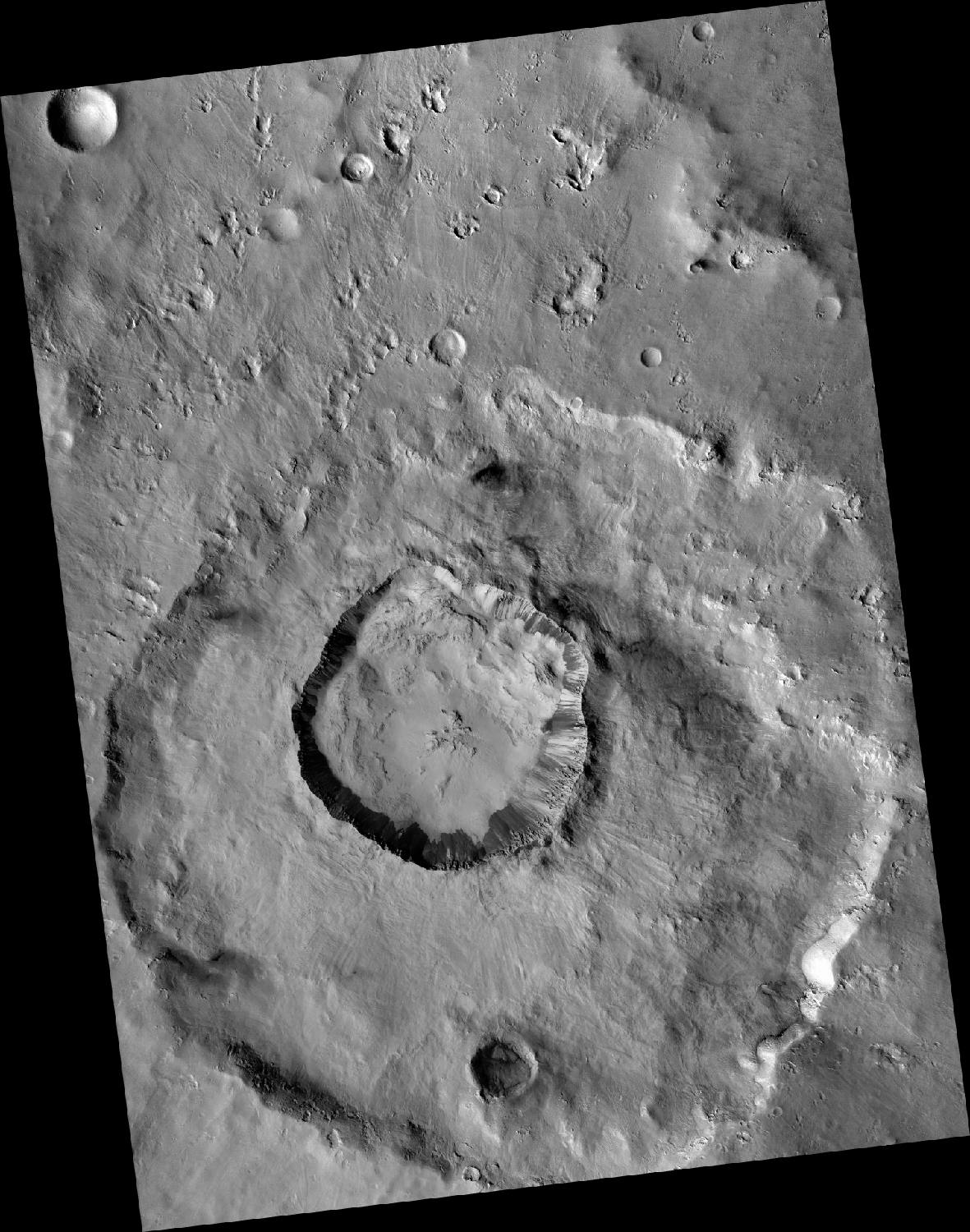
- CTX image of Dampier, with Karratha in center
- Planet: Mars
- Coordinates: 15.73°S 203.63°E
- Quadrangle: Memnonia
- Diameter: 27 km (17 mi)
- Eponym: Dampier, Australia

Dampier is an impact crater in the Memnonia quadrangle of Mars. It was named after the town of Dampier, Western Australia, in 2021.

Dampier is south of Burton crater. Karratha crater lies within Dampier. It is likely Noachian in age.
