= Hans E. Lau =

Danish astronomer

Hans-Emil Lau (16 April 1879 – 16 October 1918) was a Danish astronomer.

He started his observational career during his studies at Copenhagen University. After completing his degree in 1906 he worked at the Urania, the Treptow Observatory at Berlin, and finally at Horsholm Observatory in Copenhagen.

He is most famous for his work on Mars and Jupiter. He also worked on star parallax, the measuring of variable stars, the color of stars, and the observation of comets, sunspots, and the rings of Saturn.

He published speculative orbits of two trans-Neptunian planets in 1900, which were never found.

He died prematurely at the age of 39 during the worldwide 1918 flu pandemic. A crater on Mars was named in his honor.
