= Charles E. Burton =

Irish astronomer (1846–1882)

- Born: Charles Edward Burton; 16 September 1846; Barnton, Cheshire, England, UKGBI
- Died: 9 July 1882 (aged 35); Castleknock, Dublin, Ireland
- Occupation: Astronomer

Charles Edward Burton (16 September 1846 – 9 July 1882) was a British-born Irish astronomer.

== Early life ==
Burton was born on 16 September 1846 in Barnton, Cheshire to The Rev Edward William Burton, the incumbent of Barnton, and Margaret Burton. Burton's father was English and his mother was Irish. On 15 November 1846, Burton was baptised by his father at Christ Church, Barnton.

Suffering from ill-health, he was privately educated. By the age of 15 he had become very interested in astronomy, experimenting with celestial photography. The family returned to Ireland, where Rev. Burton was appointed curate of Rathmichael Church, Loughlinstown, County Dublin.

== Career ==
He joined Lawrence Parsons's (Lord Rosse) observatory in February 1868 as an assistant astronomer; in the 1840s, William Parsons (3rd Earl) had built the world's largest telescope at Parsonstown (Birr from 1899), a 72-inch (183 cm) reflector. Burton used a small transit telescope and learned to grind mirrors up to 15 inches (38 cm) in diameter for telescopes. His mirrors were regarded as "beyond compare". Later in 1868, Burton gained a B.A. from Trinity College Dublin.

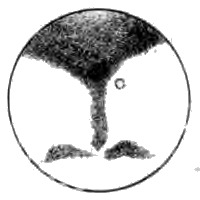
1873 drawing of Mars

He resigned his post as Rosse's assistant on account of poor health in March 1869. The following year, he went on the expedition to Augusta (also Austa/Agosta), Sicily, to observe the total solar eclipse of 22 December, and he read his paper about the event on 13 February 1871 to the Royal Irish Academy. Between 1870 and 1874, he reported from ten observations of the shadow of the Jovian moon Ganymede that the shadows appeared to be more elongated than one might expect. He travelled, in the role of a photographer, on one of the five official British expeditions to observe the transit of Venus in 1874, his expedition being to the island of Rodrigues in the Indian Ocean, near Mauritius. Using a 12-inch (30 cm) silvered-glass reflector that he had built, he observed nebulae only visible from the southern hemisphere. He spent nearly a year at the Greenwich Observatory taking measurements of the photographic plates of the transit, followed by two years at Dunsink Observatory near Dublin, again retiring because of ill-health in August 1878. His observations of the transit led him to suggest that the fuzzy limb apparent in the imaging of Venus was evidence of a planetary atmosphere.

He continued to work from his father's parsonage at Loughlinstown, County Dublin where he built his own observatory with 8-inch (20 cm) and 12-inch reflectors. In 1879, with Mars at its closest point to Earth (in opposition, he validated Giovanni Schiaparelli's 1877 observation of the appearance of 'canals' on Mars, and indeed drew different ones ['canals' had been mistranslated from the Italian canali and was meant to mean 'channels']. His sketches of the canals, and also two sketches from John Dreyer the Danish-Irish astronomer working at Dunsink, were included on a Mercator projection map in the fourth edition of. Webb's Celestial Objects (1881). However, Burton stated very clearly that astronomers should be circumspect over the permanence of the features:

'Considering the difficulty of the objects… [interpretations] given these streaks by different observers hardly afford grounds for surprise. Great caution is necessary in asserting that any "canal" is a recent formation, considering our present almost total ignorance of the conditions.'

Definitive proof of the absence of linear features was only provided in the 1960s by the NASA/JPL Mariner 4 probe.

Burton also provided the first scientific evidence of clouds on Mars, in notes from 5 January 1880, which he attributed to ground mists and the long exposure of the ice at the south pole to the Sun's energy. The Greek astronomer E. M. Antoniadi, who became known particularly for his study of Mars, referred to this historical observation as "genius".

Burton crater on Mars. NASA/JPL-Caltech/Arizona State University.

Preparations for further British expeditions to watch the next transit of Venus (1882), this time to Durban, Cape Colony, and to set up a permanent observatory, interrupted Burton's experiments at lunar photography. Weeks into this preparation, he succumbed to the heart disease at the root of his poor constitution, suffering a fatal heart-attack in the church at Castleknock, on Sunday 9 July 1882. Despite his sickly nature, some attributed his early death to repeated exposure to cold nights while observing the heavens.

== Legacy ==
Colleagues of his time deplored the loss of such an outstanding astronomer at the age of 35. His colleague and friend, Wentworth Erck, wrote in the Astronomical Register:

'His loss will be deeply felt by those who knew him well, for these laud him for his blameless life and courteous manners, as much as they respected him for his high scientific attainments and unsurpassed powers as an astronomical observer'.

In 1973, Burton's astronomical work was honoured by the International Astronomical Union which named the crater Burton on Mars after him.
