= Khujirt (crater) =

Impact crater on Mars

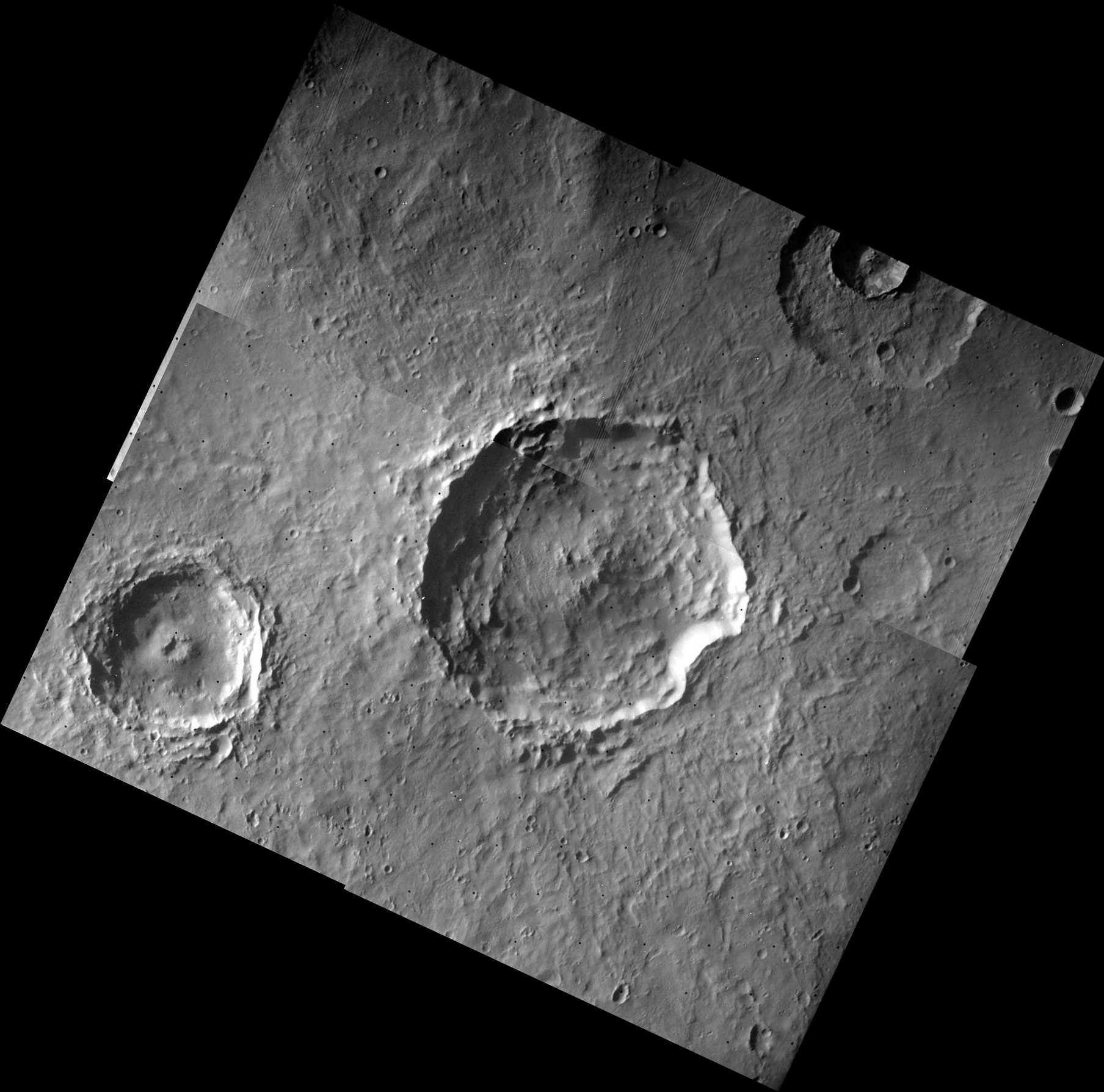
- Viking Orbiter 1 mosaic with Khujirt at center
- Planet: Mars
- Coordinates: 16.29°S 203.03°E
- Quadrangle: Memnonia
- Diameter: 38 km (24 mi)
- Eponym: Khujirt, Mongolia

Khujirt is an impact crater in the Memnonia quadrangle of Mars. It was named after the district of Khujirt, central Mongolia, in 2021.

Khujirt is south of Burton crater.

The crater is thought to be about 1.5 billion years old. The meteorite Northwest Africa 7034 is suggested to be derived from the impact ejecta of this crater that was ejected into space by the much later impact that formed the Karratha crater around 5-10 million years ago.
