= Main (Martian crater) =

Crater on Mars

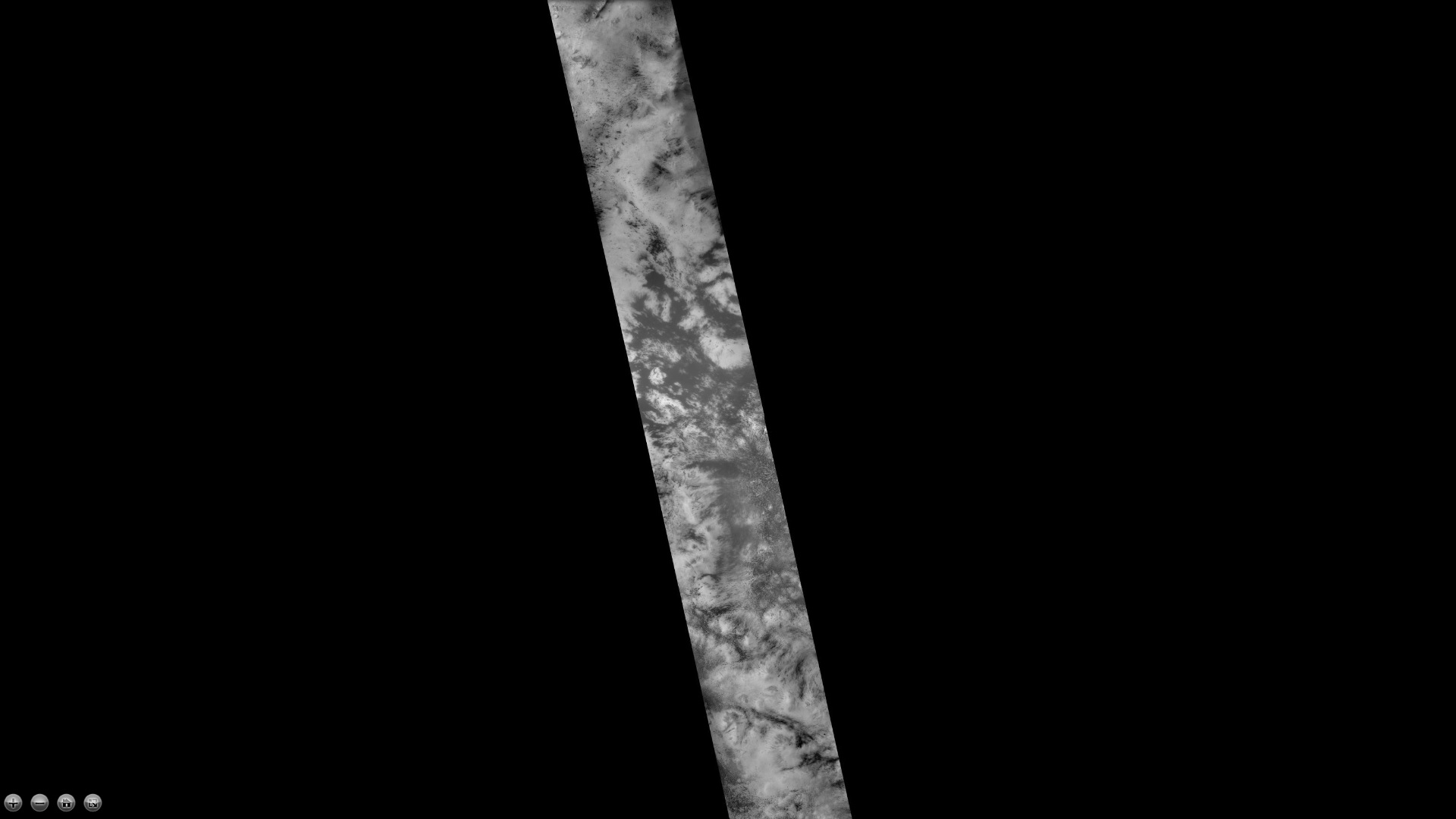
West side of Main crater (Martian crater), as seen by CTX camera (on Mars Reconnaissance Orbiter).

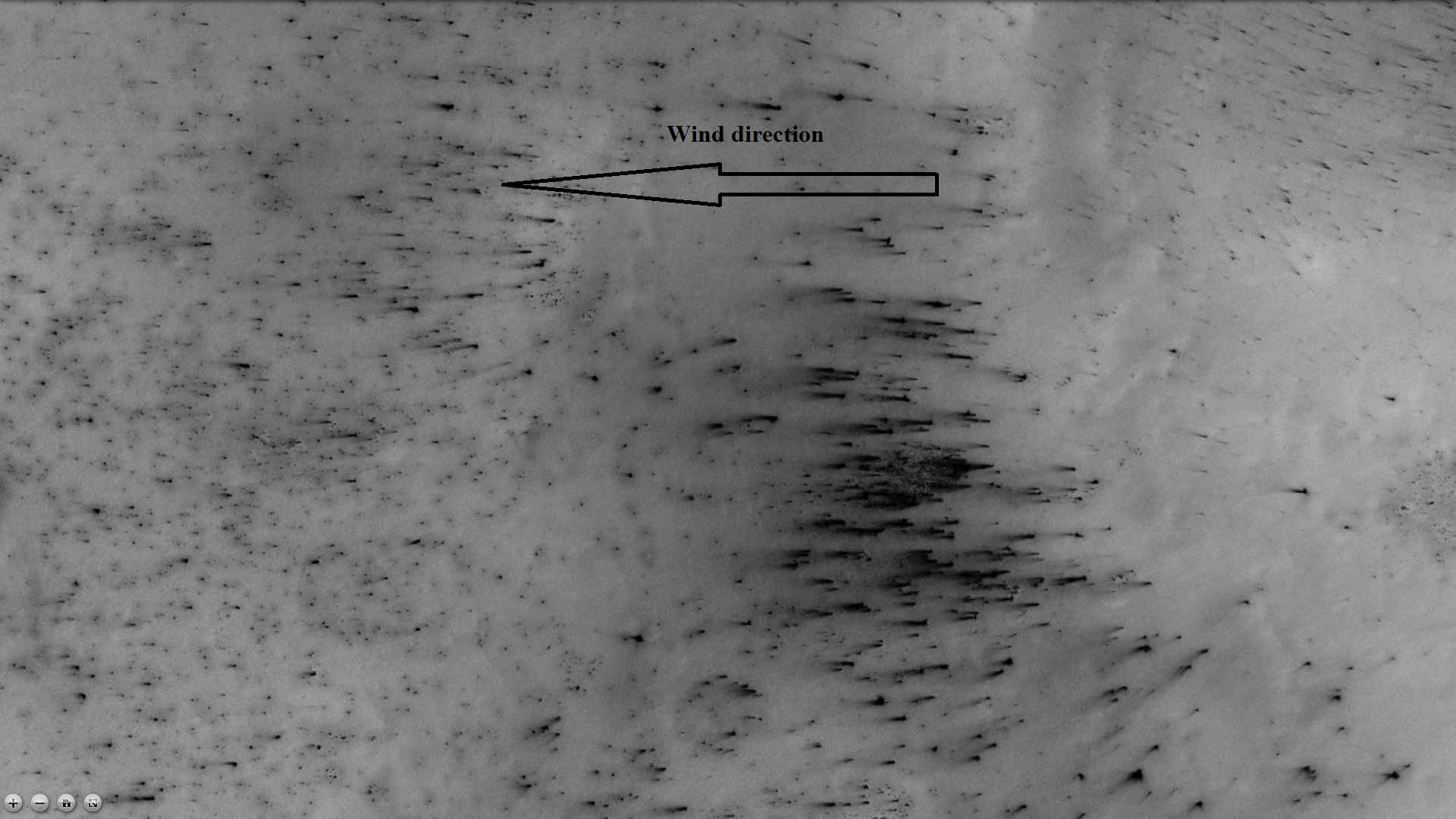
Dust trails in Main crater, as seen by CTX camera (on Mars Reconnaissance Orbiter).Arrow indicates wind direction. In the spring, as the temperature rises, dry ice turns into a pressurized gas, and then blows through a weak spot and carries with it dust. If there is a wind, the dust is deposited in an elongated form as in this image.

Main is an impact crater on Mars, located in the Mare Australe quadrangle at 76.6°S latitude and 310.9°W longitude. It measures 109.0 kilometers in diameter and was named after Rev. Robert Main. The name was approved in 1973, by the International Astronomical Union (IAU) Working Group for Planetary System Nomenclature (WGPSN). The floor of Main shows dark portions which are caused by pressurized carbon dioxide blowing dust in the atmosphere in the spring when the temperature goes up. Some of the dust is shaped into streaks if there is a wind.

Many ideas have been advanced to explain these features. These features can be seen in some of the pictures below.

Close up views of these features often reveal fuzzy features that have been named "spiders."

== See also ==
- Climate of Mars
- Geology of Mars
- Geyser (Mars)
- Impact crater
- Impact event
- List of craters on Mars
- Ore resources on Mars
- Planetary nomenclature
- Water on Mars
