= Neukum (Martian crater) =

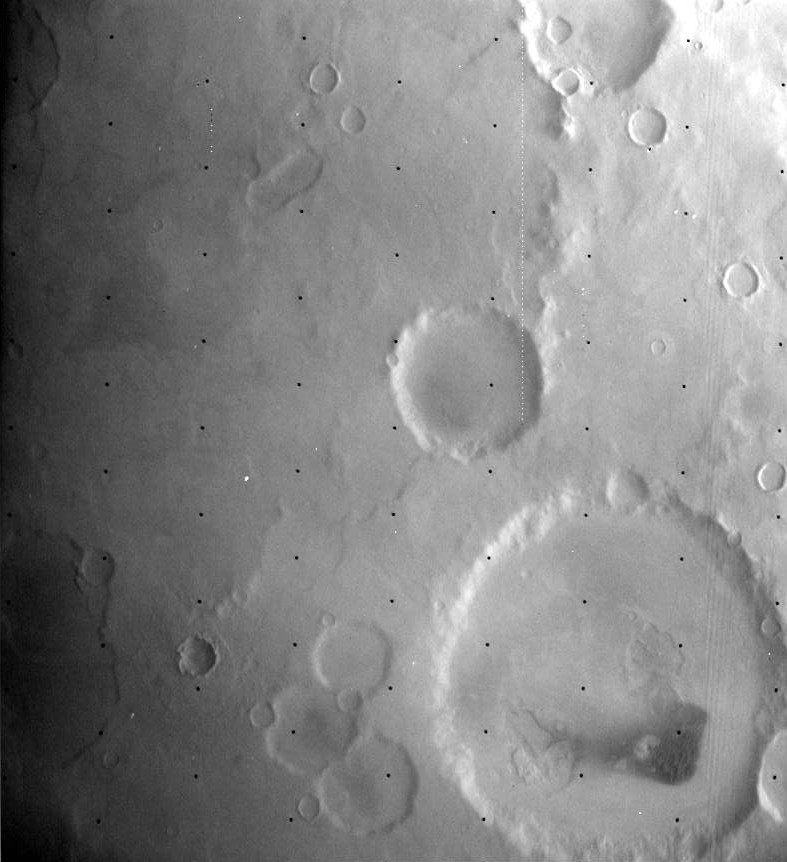
- Viking Orbiter 1 image with Neukum in lower right
- Planet: Mars
- Region: Noachis quadrangle
- Coordinates: 44.9°S 28.4°W
- Quadrangle: Argyre
- Diameter: 102 km (63 mi)
- Eponym: Gerhard Neukum

Neukum is an impact crater on Mars. The crater was named after German planetary scientist Gerhard Neukum, by the IAU in 2017.

The crater floor has two large, irregularly shaped pits, and these occur regionally in and between other nearby craters. The crater itself is believed to be at least 3.5 to 3.7 Ga in age, with various younger ages for surficial deposits including a prominent dune field of basaltic material.

== Views from Mars Express ==
Gerhard Neukum, after which this crater is named, was instrumental in development of the ESA's Mars Express orbiter.

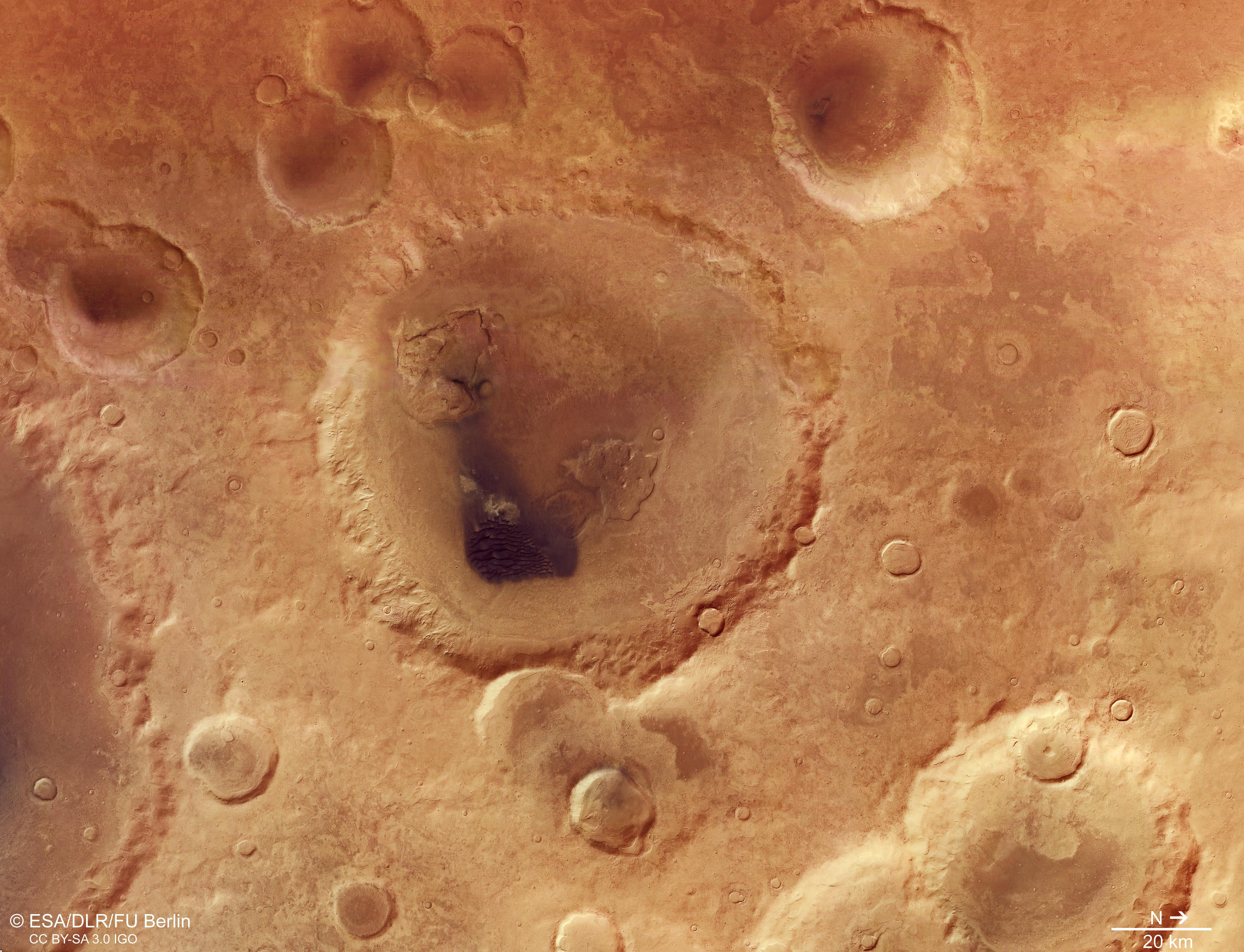
Color image

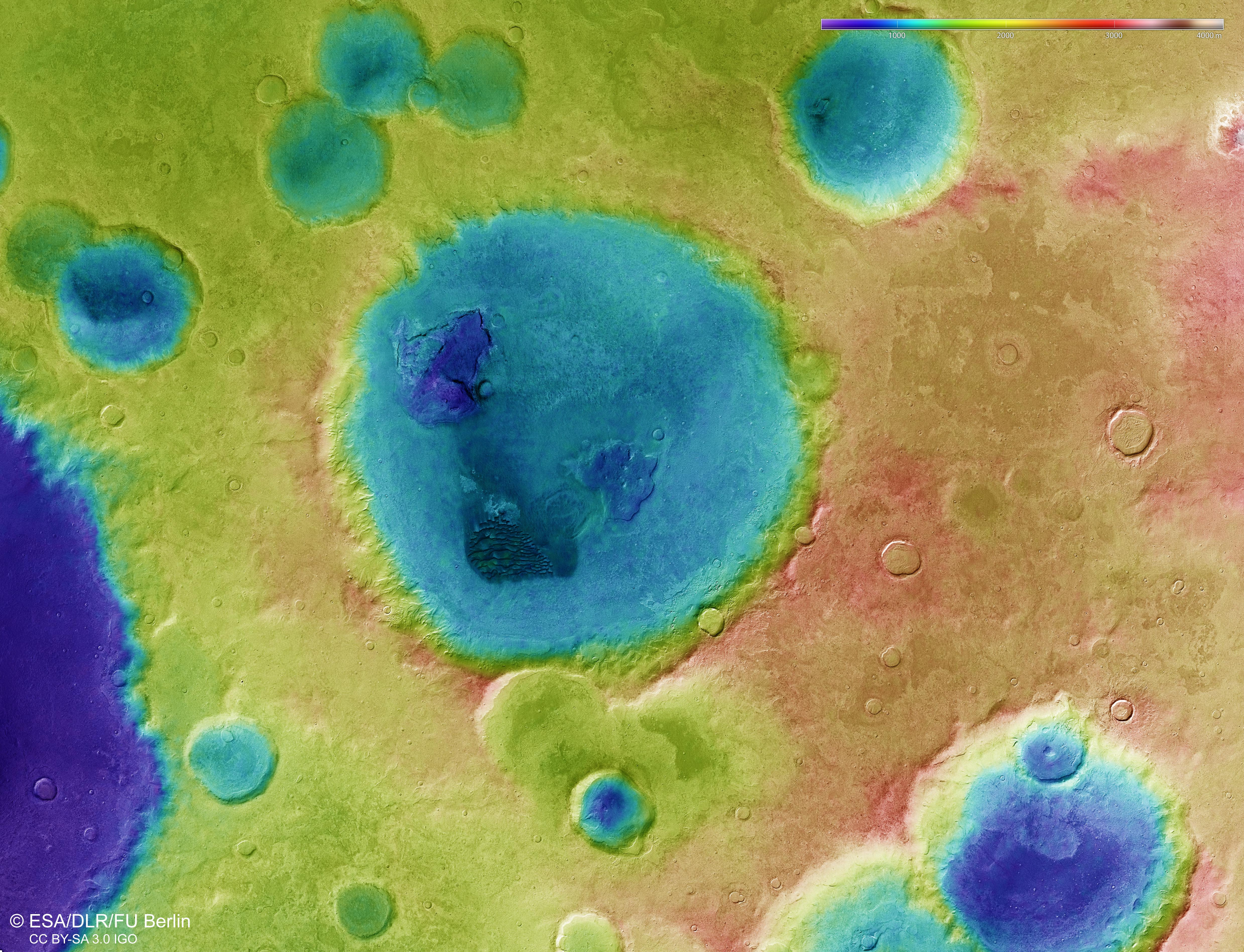
Topographic map

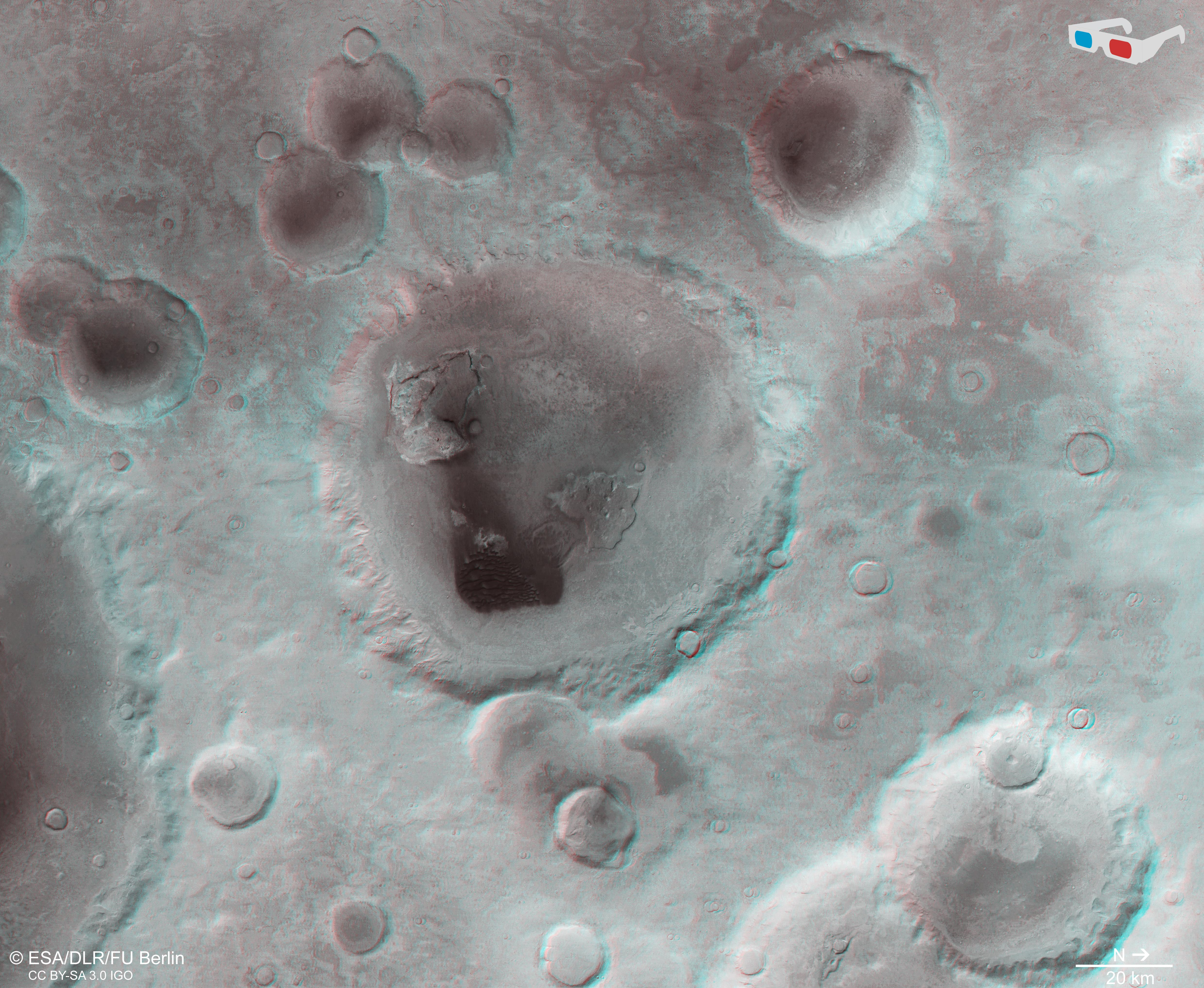
3D Anaglyph (red-blue glasses required)

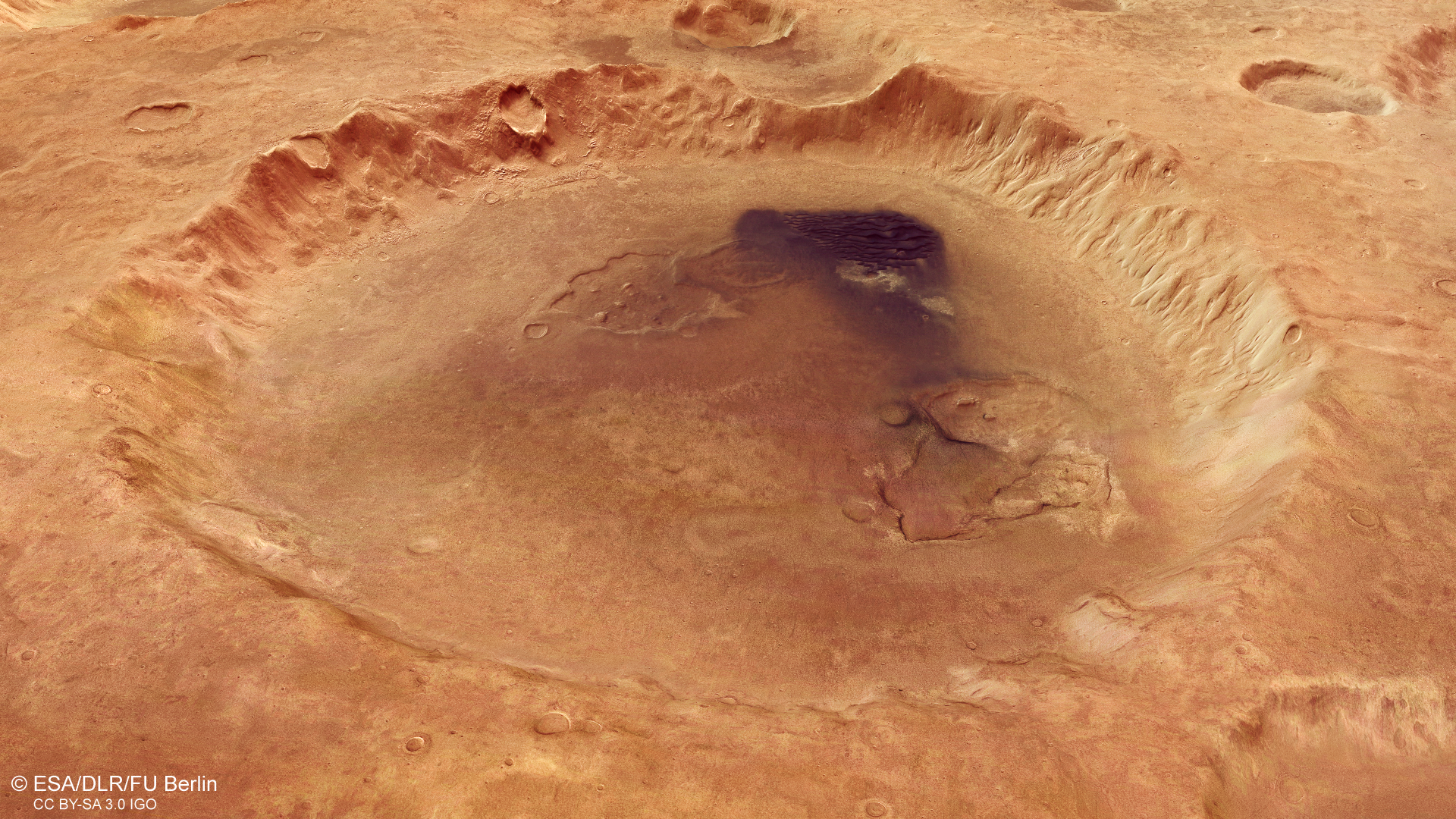
Perspective view
