= Edwin P. Martz =

American physicist and astronomer (1916-1967)

Edwin P. Martz, Jr (1916 – September 25, 1966) was an American physicist and astronomer.

In 1935, Martz enrolled in the University of Chicago and pledged the Delta Upsilon fraternity. He worked with William Pickering at Lowell Observatory in 1937, creating the first color photographs of Mars. He then worked at the Dearborn Observatory from 1939 until 1941. During the Second World War, he was an optical engineer for the U.S. Army and worked on a tracking system for missiles using telescopes. After the war, he continued to work in this field until 1958. He then became a research physicist at the Scripps Institute, and later accepted a position at the Jet Propulsion Laboratory in 1960. There, he was responsible for the cameras on the Ranger spacecraft exploring the Moon. At the time of his death, he had worked out the preliminary design for the camera system of the Voyager space mission. His papers were donated to the University of Chicago, his alma mater.

== Honors ==
Martz received the George W. Goddard Award in 1964. In 1973, a crater on Mars was named in his honor.
