= Gerhard Neukum =

German planetary scientist

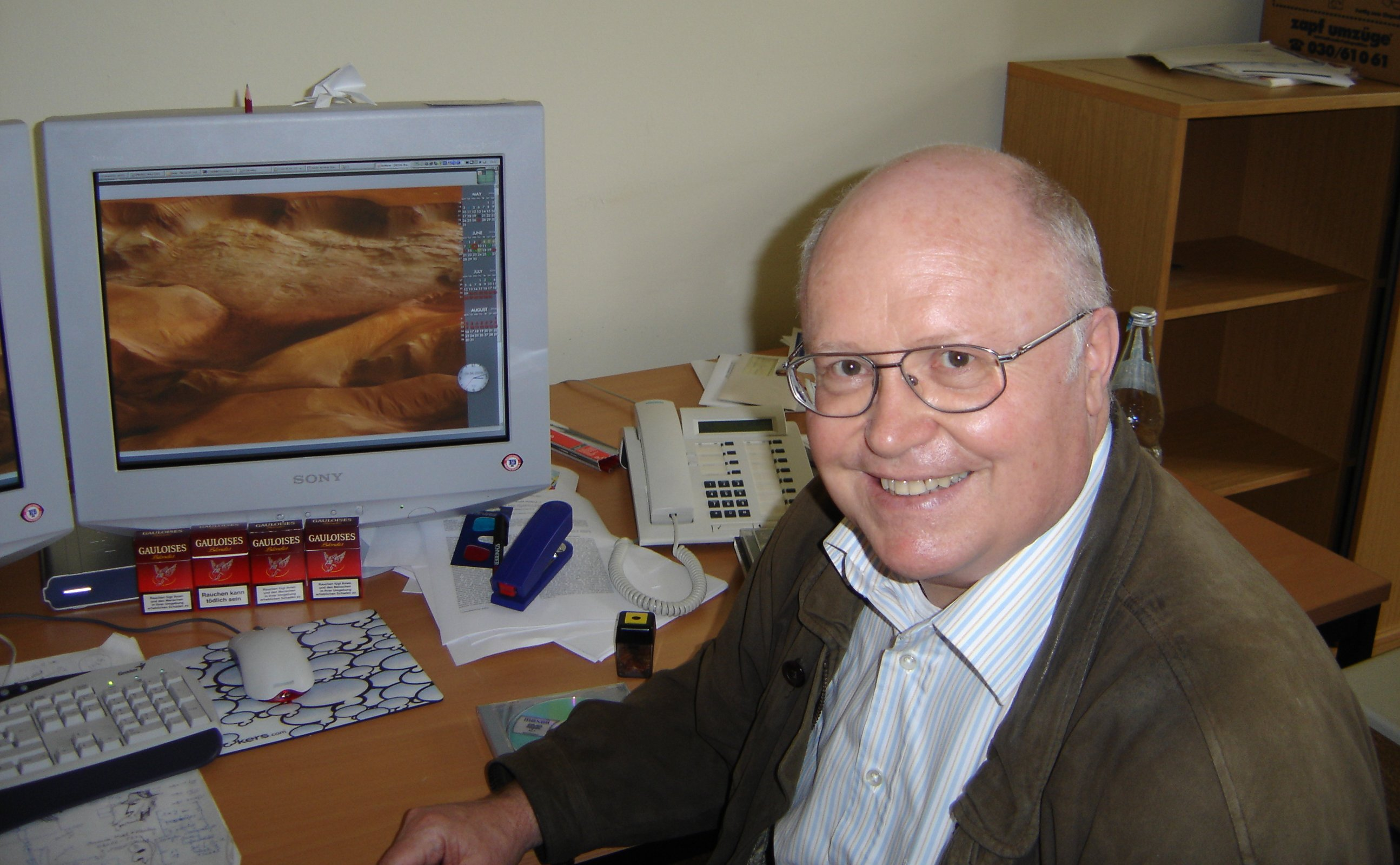
Gerhard Neukum at Free University of Berlin.

Gerhard Neukum (1944-2014) was a German planetary scientist who worked on the chronology of solar system bodies. He obtained a Ph.D. in physics at Heidelberg University. He was a professor at LMU Munich and at the Free University of Berlin.

Neukum was involved in the ESA Mars Express mission, the joint ESA-NASA Cassini–Huygens mission, the ESA Rosetta mission, and the NASA Dawn mission. He also led a consortium of scientists in developing the first proposal for a Mercury orbiter spacecraft, submitted to ESA in 1985.

The asteroid 6150 was named after Neukum.

The crater Neukum on Mars was named after him by the IAU in 2017.
