= Karratha (crater) =

Impact crater on Mars

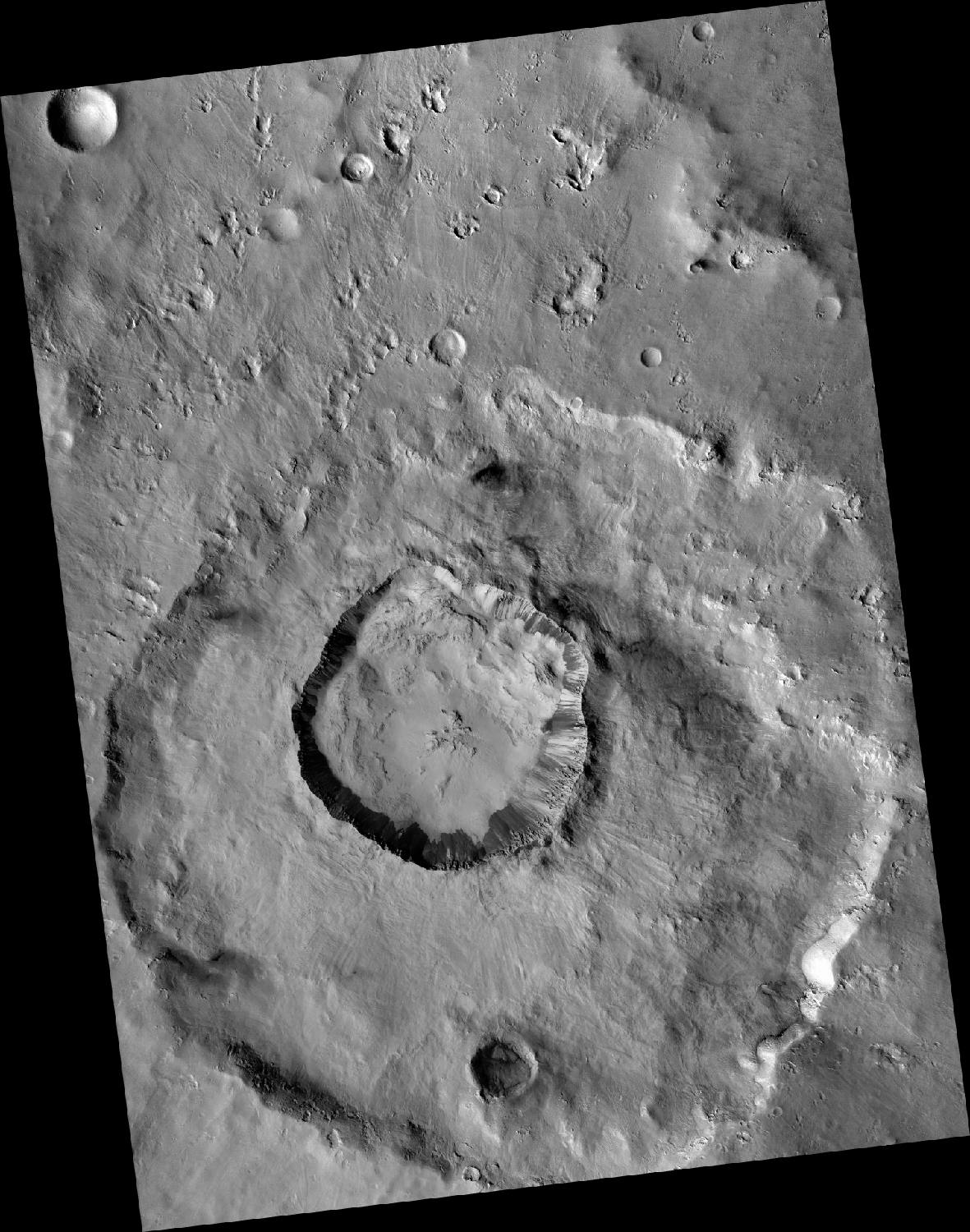
- CTX image of Dampier crater, with Karratha in center
- Planet: Mars
- Coordinates: 15.69°S 203.60°E
- Quadrangle: Memnonia
- Diameter: 10 km (6.2 mi)
- Eponym: Karratha, Australia

Karratha is an impact crater in the Memnonia quadrangle of Mars. It was named after the town of Karratha, Western Australia, in 2021.

Karratha lies within the larger Dampier, which is south of Burton crater.

The crater is thought to be around 5-10 million years old. It has been suggested to be the source crater of the Martian meteorite Northwest Africa 7034.
