= Chronology of discoveries of water on Mars =

Spacecraft missions have provided abundant evidence of water on Mars, dating back to the Mariner 9 mission, which arrived at Mars in 1971. This article provides a mission-by-mission breakdown of the discoveries they have made.

== Mariner 9 ==
Mariner 9 arrived at Mars in November 1971 and became the first spacecraft to orbit another planet. Its imaging campaign, which covered 85% of the Martian surface, revealed large fluvial channels originating in patches of chaotic terrain, possibly formed by the melting of permafrost, that appear to flow northward into the Chryse Planitia region. These were the first strong geomorphological pieces of evidence that liquid water had once flowed on the Martian surface. The findings from the Mariner 9 mission underpinned the later Viking program, which examined many of these features in greater detail. The Valles Marineris canyon system, a primarily tectonic rift structure stretching over 4,000 kilometres (2,490 mi), is named after the spacecraft.

== Viking program ==
Viking program discovered many geological forms that are typically formed from large amounts of water. Huge river valleys were found in many areas. They showed that floods of water broke through dams, carved deep valleys, eroded grooves into bedrock, and traveled thousands of kilometers. Large areas in the southern hemisphere contained branched valley networks, suggesting that rain once fell. The flanks of some volcanoes are believed to have been exposed to rainfall because they resemble those occurring on Hawaiian volcanoes. Many craters look as if the impactor fell into mud. When they were formed, ice in the soil may have melted, turned the ground into mud, and then the mud flowed across the surface. Normally, material from an impact rises, then falls. It does not flow across the surface, going around obstacles, as it does on some Martian craters. Regions, called "chaotic terrain", seemed to have quickly lost great volumes of water, which caused large channels to form downstream. Underground volcanism may have melted frozen ice; the water then flowed away, and the ground collapsed, leaving chaotic terrain.

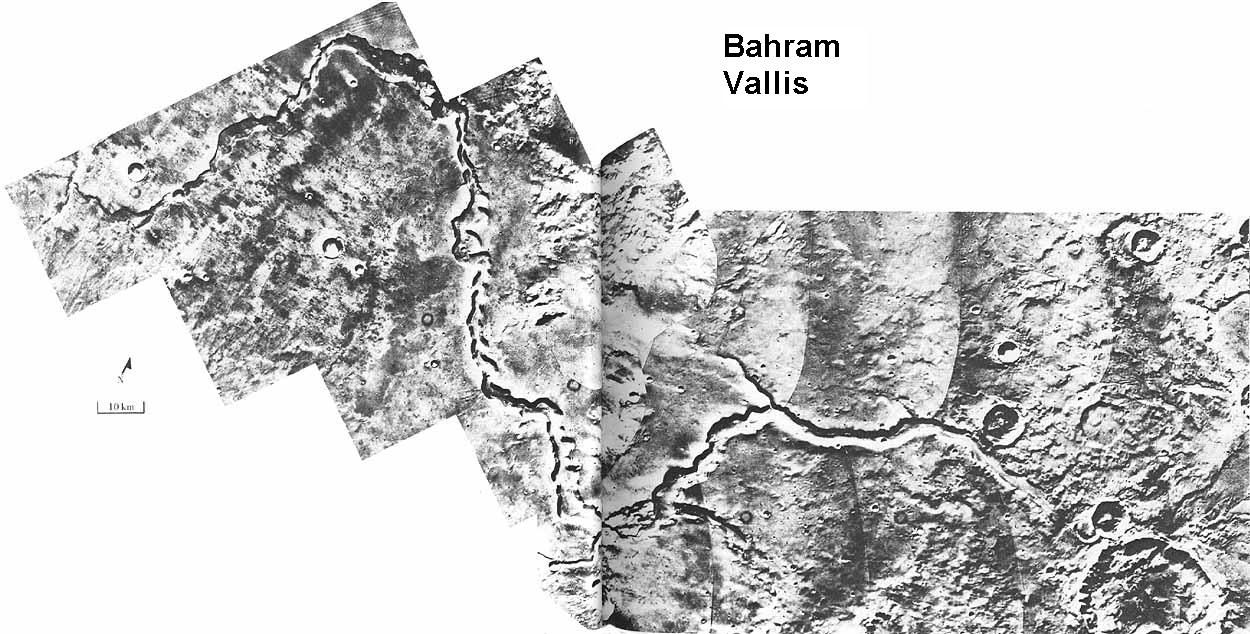
Bahram Vallis, as seen by Viking. Valley is located in Northern Lunae Planum and the Lunae Palus quadrangle. It lies nearly midway between Vedra Valles and lower Kasei Valles.

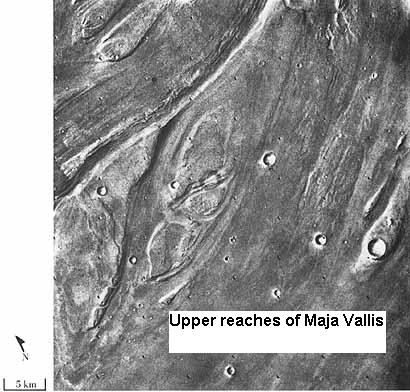
Streamlined Islands seen by Viking showed that large floods occurred on Mars. Image is located in Lunae Palus quadrangle.

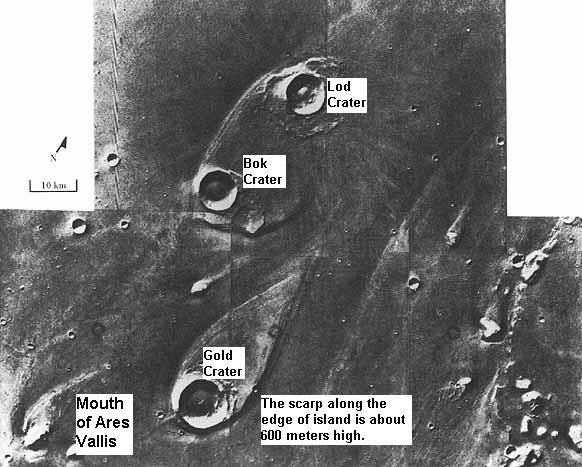
Tear-drop shaped islands caused by flood waters from Maja Valles, as seen by Viking Orbiter. Image is located in Oxia Palus quadrangle. The islands are formed in the ejecta of Lod, Bok, and Gold craters.

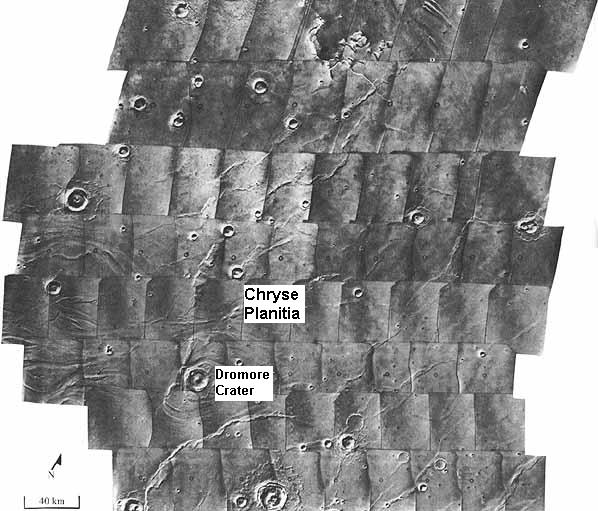
Scour Patterns, located in Lunae Palus quadrangle, were produced by flowing water from Maja Valles, which lies just to the left of this mosaic. Detail of flow around Dromore crater is shown on the next image.

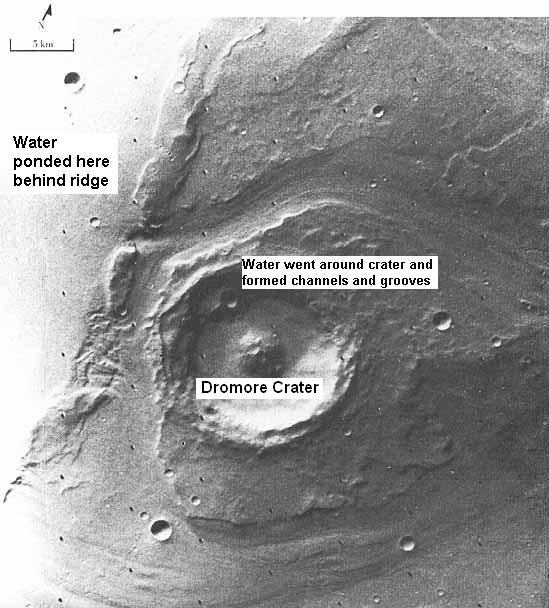
Great amounts of water were required to carry out the erosion shown in this Viking image. Image is located in Lunae Palus quadrangle. The erosion shaped the ejecta around Dromore crater.

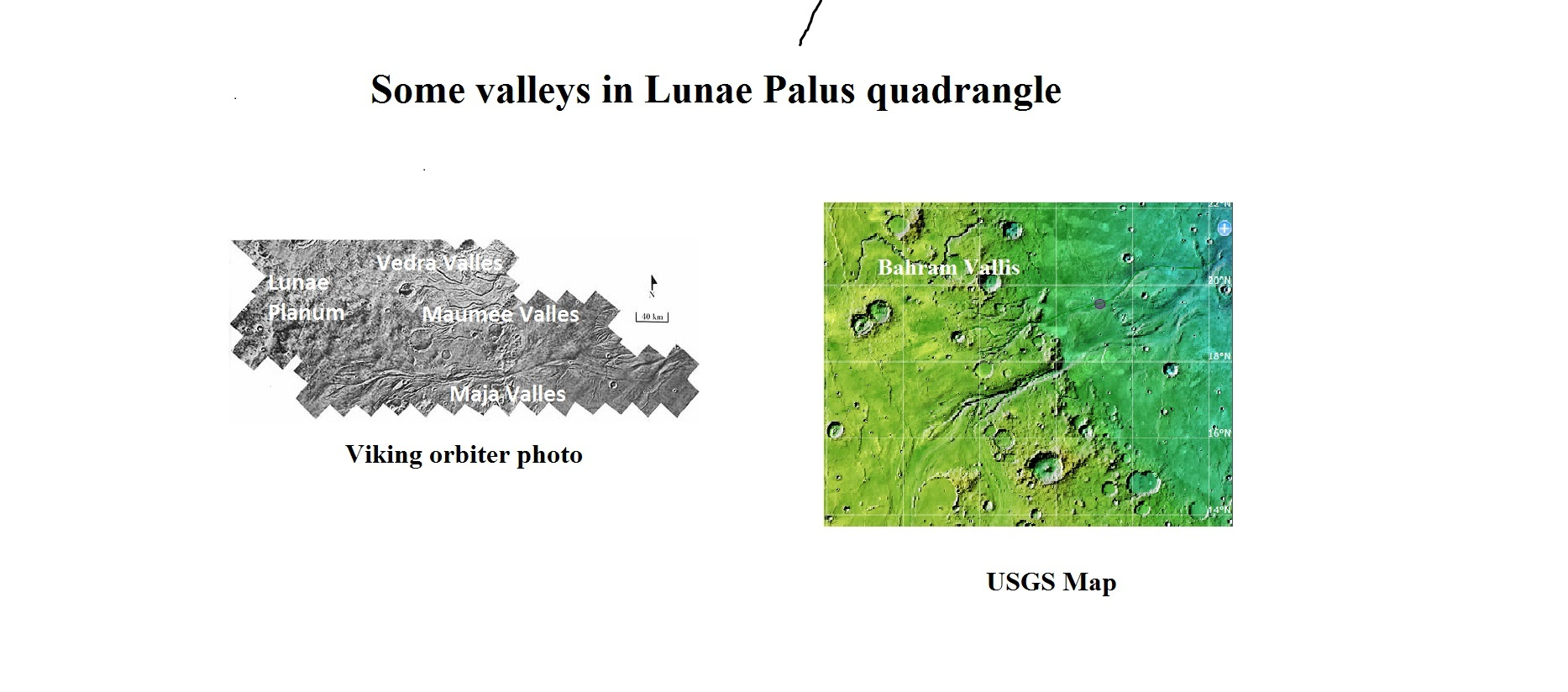
Waters from Vedra Valles, Maumee Valles, and Maja Valles went from Lunae Planum on the left, to Chryse Planitia on the right. Image is located in Lunae Palus quadrangle and was taken by Viking Orbiter.

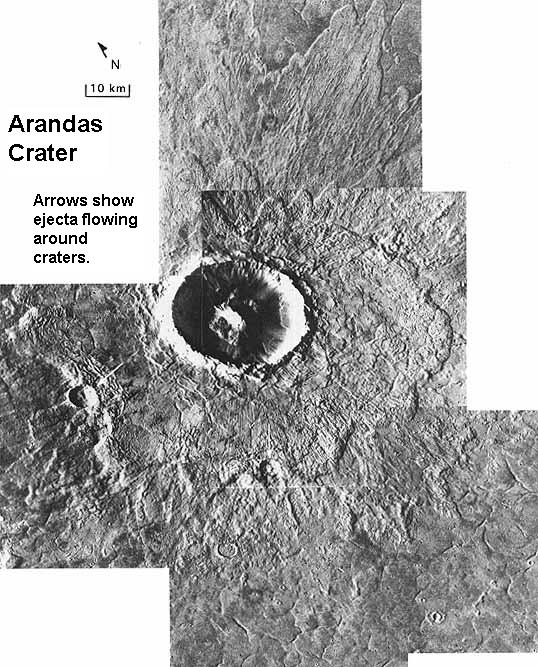
The ejecta from Arandas crater acts like mud. It moves around small craters (indicated by arrows), instead of just falling down on them. Craters like this suggest that large amounts of frozen water were melted when the impact crater was produced. Image is located in Mare Acidalium quadrangle and was taken by Viking Orbiter.

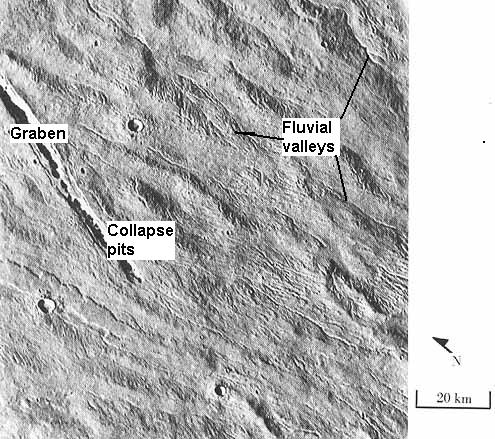
This view of the flank of Alba Mons shows several channels/troughs. Some channels are associated with lava flows; others are probably caused by running water. A large trough or graben turns into a line of collapse pits. Image is located in Arcadia quadrangle and was taken by Viking Orbiter.

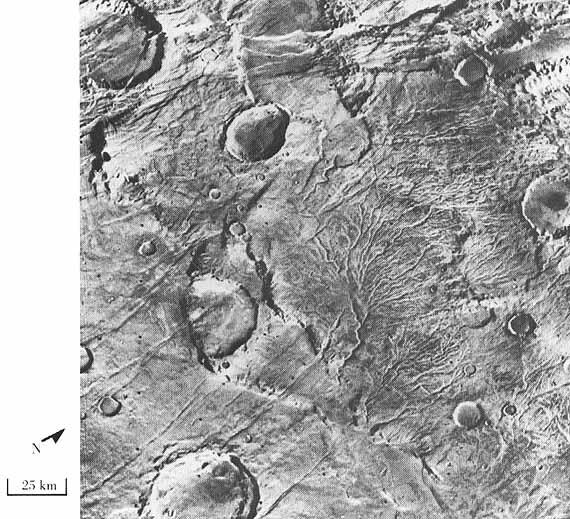
Branched channels in Thaumasia quadrangle, as seen by Viking Orbiter. Networks of channels like this are strong evidence for rain on Mars in the past.

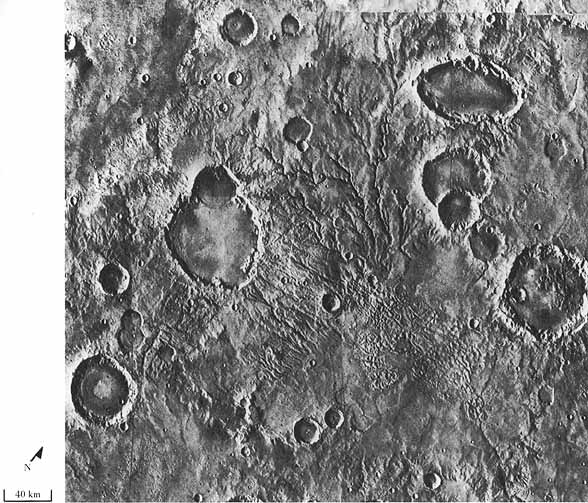
The branched channels seen by Viking from orbit strongly suggested that it rained on Mars in the past. Image is located in Margaritifer Sinus quadrangle.

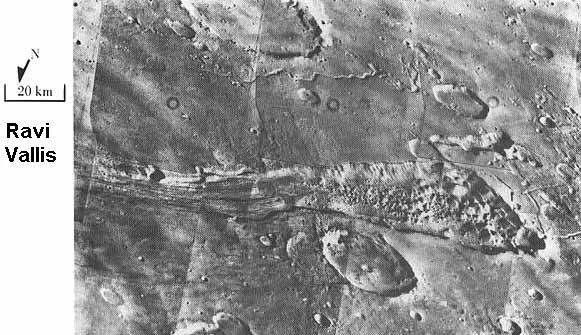
Ravi Vallis, as seen by Viking Orbiter. Ravi Vallis was probably formed when catastrophic floods came out of the ground to the right (chaotic terrain). Image located in Margaritifer Sinus quadrangle.

Results from Viking lander experiments strongly suggest the presence of water in the present and in the past of Mars. All samples heated in the gas chromatograph-mass spectrometer (GSMS) gave off water. However, the way the samples were handled prohibited an exact measurement of the amount of water. But it was around 1%. General chemical analysis suggested the surface had been exposed to water in the past. Some chemicals in the soil contained sulfur and chlorine that were like those remaining after seawater evaporates. Sulfur was more concentrated in the crust on top of the soil than in the bulk soil beneath. So it was concluded that the upper crust was cemented together with sulfates that were transported to the surface dissolved in water. This process is common in Earth's deserts. The sulfur may be present as sulfates of sodium, magnesium, calcium, or iron. A sulfide of iron is also possible. Using results from the chemical measurements, mineral models suggest that the soil could be a mixture of "about 80% iron-rich clay, about 10% magnesium sulfate (kieserite?), about 5% carbonate (calcite), and about 5% iron oxides (hematite, magnetite, goethite?)". These minerals are typical weathering products of mafic igneous rocks. The presence of clay, magnesium sulfate, kieserite, calcite, hematite, and goethite strongly suggests that water was once in the area. Sulfate contains chemically bound water; its presence suggests water was around in the past. Viking 2 found a similar group of minerals. Because Viking 2 was much farther north, pictures it took in the winter showed frost.

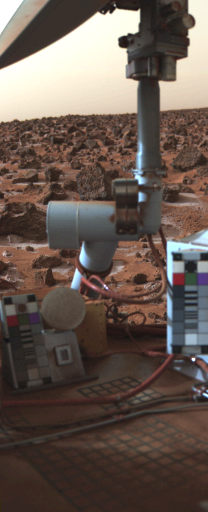
Frost on Mars.

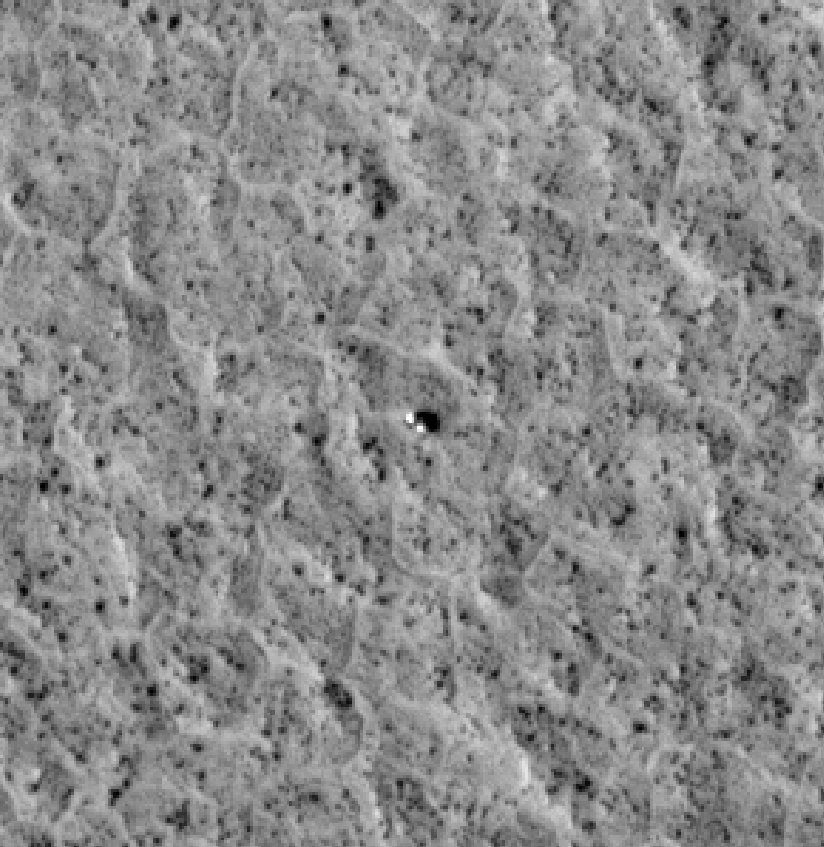
Photo of the Viking 2 lander taken by the Mars Reconnaissance Orbiter in December 2006.

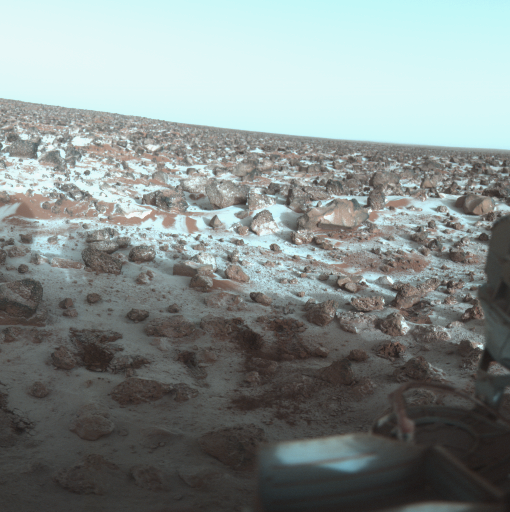
Frost at the landing site.

== Mars Global Surveyor ==
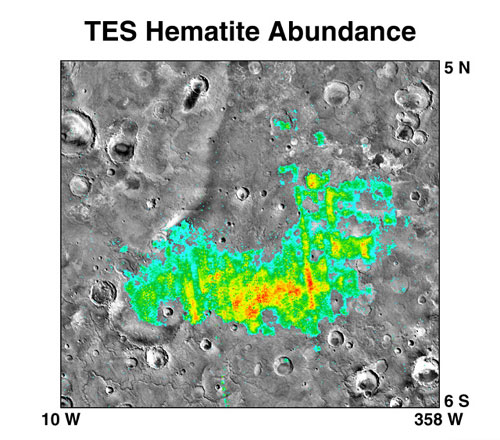
Map showing distribution of hematite in Sinus Meridiani, as seen by TES. This data was used to target the landing of Opportunity Rover. Hematite is usually formed in the presence of water. Opportunity landed here and found definite evidence for water.

The Mars Global Surveyor's Thermal Emission Spectrometer (TES) is an instrument able to detect mineral composition on Mars. Mineral composition gives information on the presence or absence of water in ancient times. TES identified a large (30,000 square-kilometer) area (in the Nili Fossae formation) that contained the mineral olivine. It is thought that the ancient impact that created the Isidis basin resulted in faults that exposed the olivine. Olivine is present in many mafic volcanic rocks; in the presence of water, it weathers into minerals such as goethite, chlorite, smectite, maghemite, and hematite. The discovery of olivine is strong evidence that parts of Mars have been extremely dry for a long time. Olivine was also discovered in many other small outcrops within 60 degrees north and south of the equator. Olivine has been found in the SNC (shergottite, nakhlite, and chassigny) meteorites that are generally accepted to have come from Mars.

On December 6, 2006, NASA released photos of two regions called Terra Sirenum and Centauri Montes, which appear to show the presence of liquid water on Mars at some point between 1999 and 2001.

Hundreds of gullies have been discovered that were formed from liquid water, possibly in recent times. These gullies occur on steep slopes and mostly in certain bands of latitude.

Below are some examples of gullies photographed by Mars Global Surveyor.

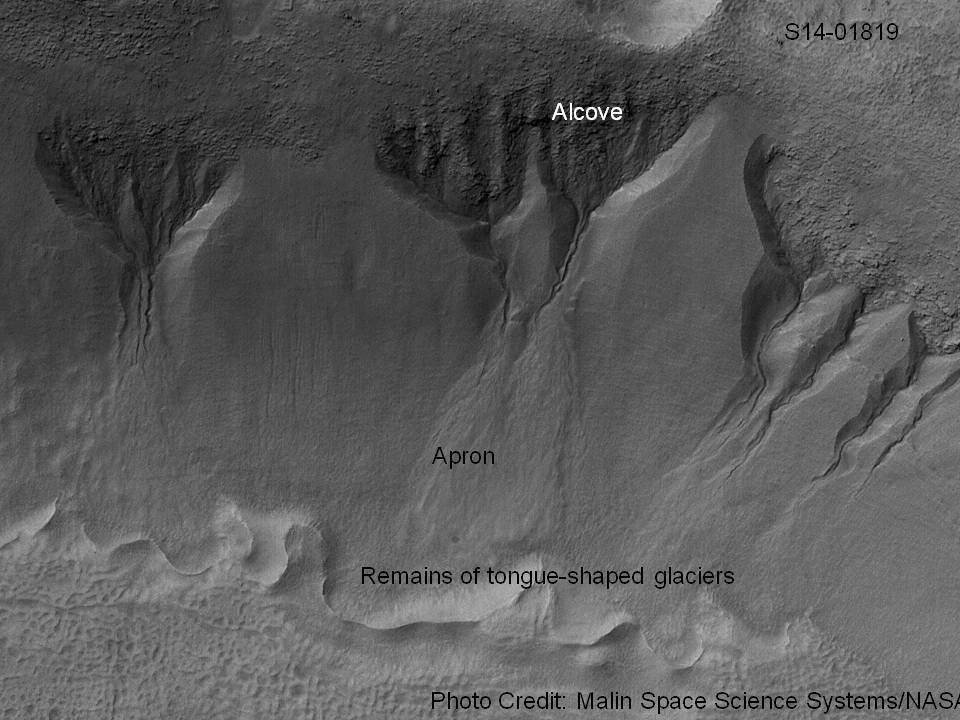
Group of gullies on north wall of crater that lies west of the crater Newton (41.3047 degrees south latitude, 192.89 east longitude). Image is located in the Phaethontis quadrangle.

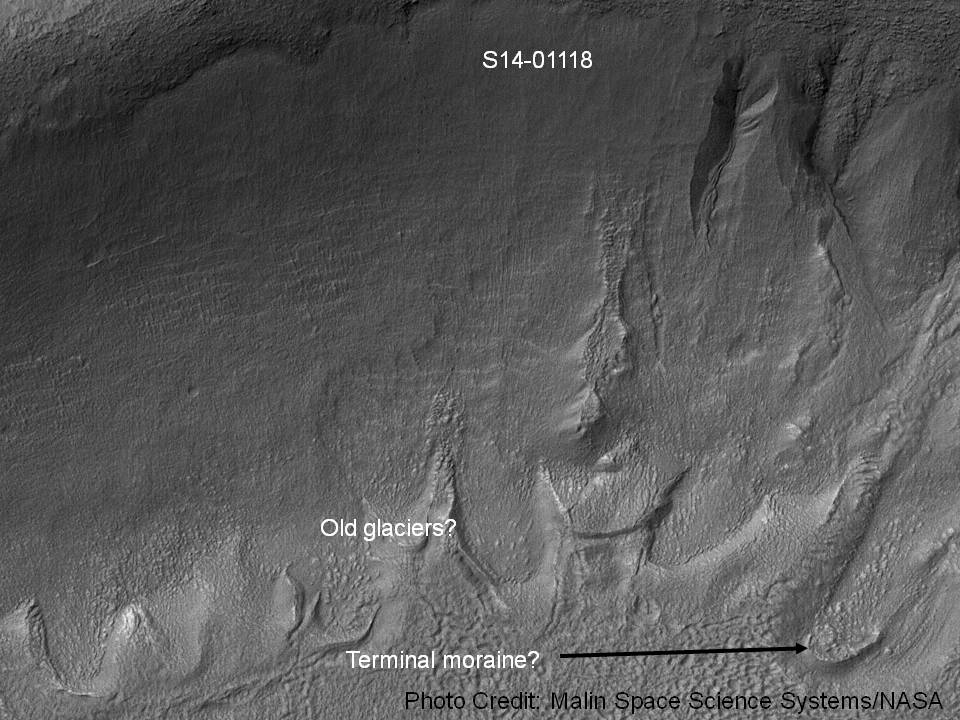
Gullies in a crater in Eridania quadrangle, north of the large crater Kepler. Features that may be remains of old glaciers are present. One, to the right, has the shape of a tongue.

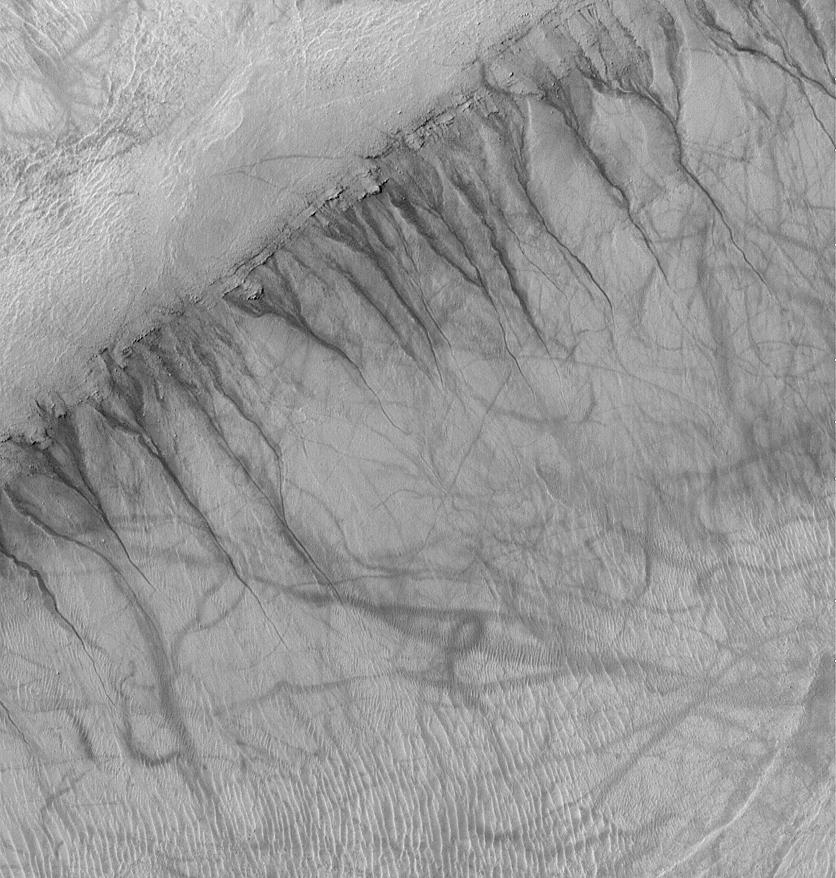
Gullies on one wall of Kaiser crater. Gullies usually are found in only one wall of a crater. Location is Noachis quadrangle.

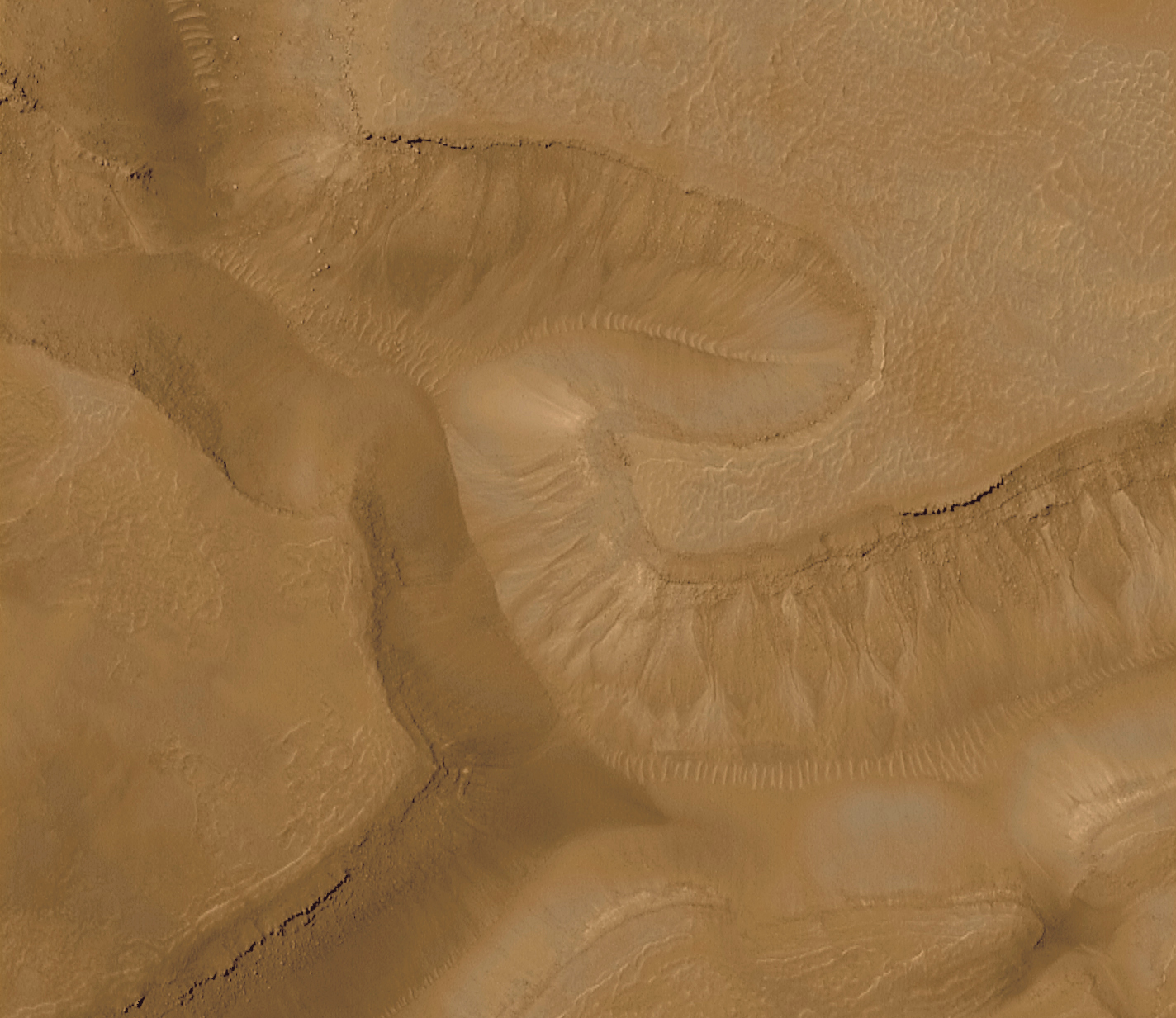
Full color image of gullies on wall of Gorgonum Chaos. Image is located in the Phaethontis quadrangle.

A few channels on Mars displayed inner channels that suggest sustained fluid flows. The best-known is the one in Nanedi Valles. Another was found in Nirgal Vallis.

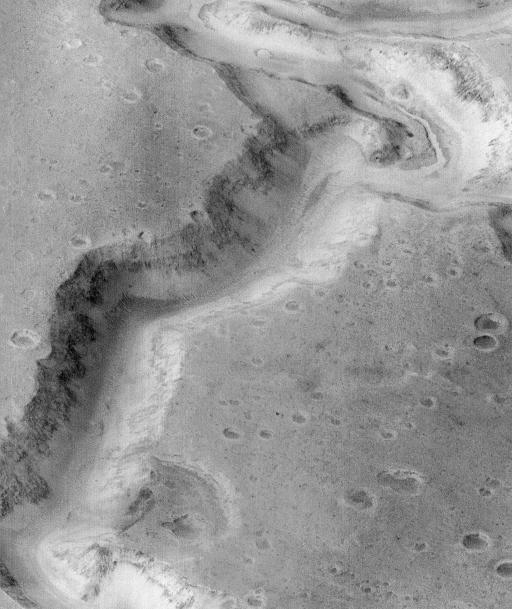
Inner channel (near top of the image) on floor of Nanedi Valles that suggests that water flowed for a fairly long period. Image from Lunae Palus quadrangle.

Many places on Mars show dark streaks on steep slopes, such as crater walls. Dark slope streaks have been studied since the Mariner and Viking missions. It seems that streaks start out being dark, then they become lighter with age. Often, they originate with a small, narrow spot, then widen and extend downhill for hundreds of meters. Streaks do not seem to be associated with any particular layer of material because they do not always start at a common level along a slope. Although many of the streaks appear very dark, they are only 10% or less darker than the surrounding surface. Mars Global Surveyor found that new streaks have formed in less than one year on Mars.

The generally accepted explanation for the streaks is that they are formed from the avalanching of a thin layer of bright dust that is covering a darker surface. Bright dust settles on all Martian surfaces after a period of time.

Dark streaks can be seen in the images below, as seen from Mars Global Surveyor.

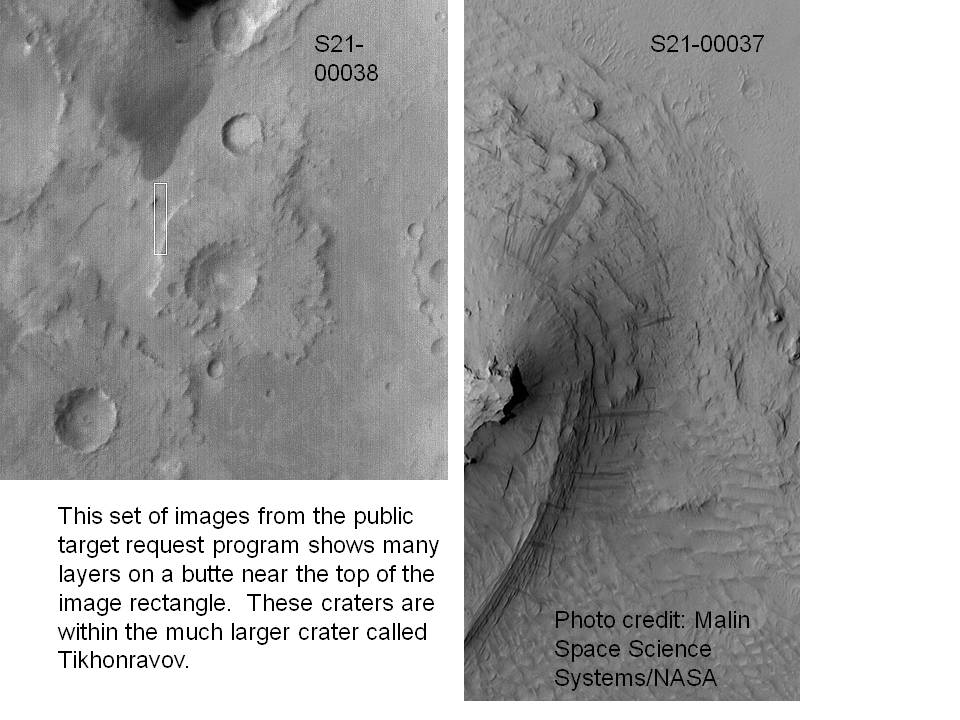
Layers in Tikhonravov crater in Arabia. Layers may form from volcanoes, the wind, or by deposition under water. The craters on the left are pedestal craters. Dark slope streaks are seen to originate from certain layers (you may need to click on image to see the streaks).

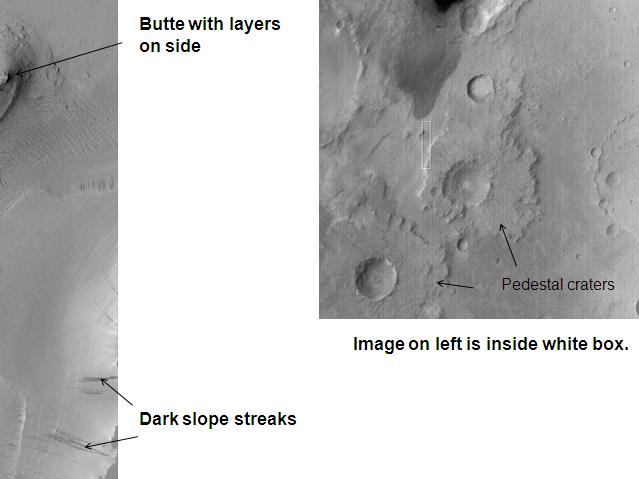
Tikhonravov crater floor in Arabia quadrangle. Click on image to see dark slope streaks and layers.

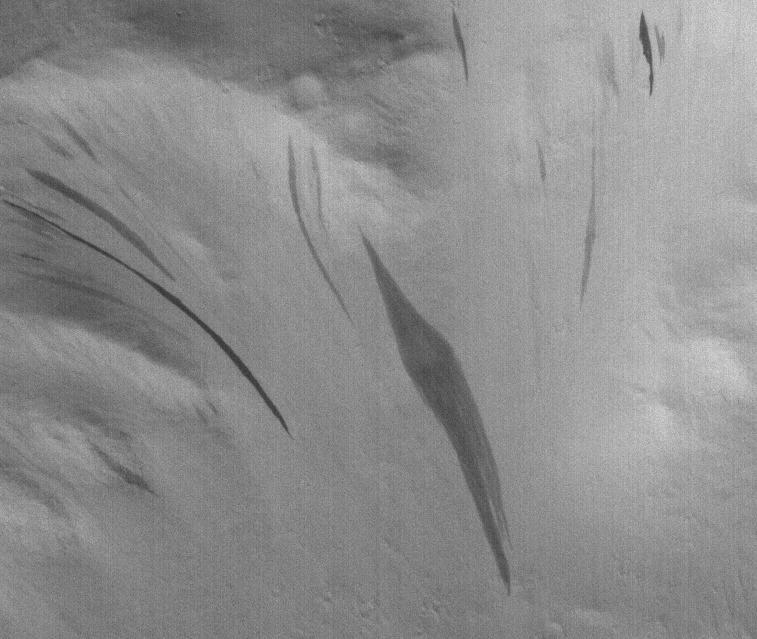
Dark streaks in Diacria quadrangle.

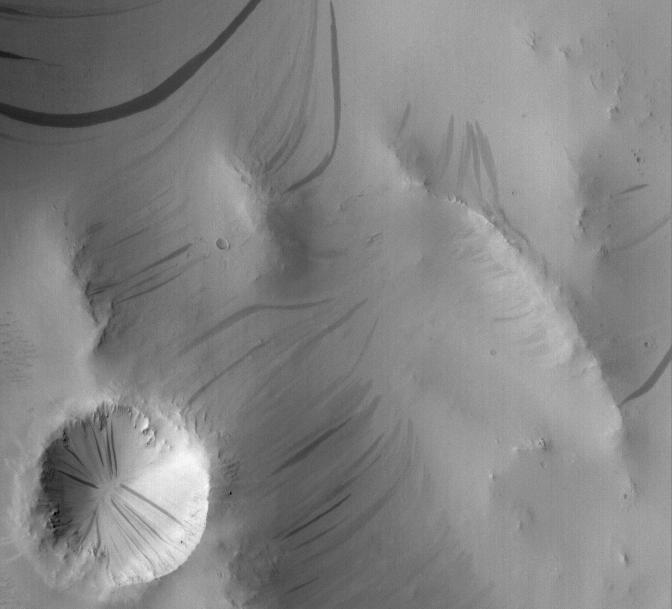
Dark Streaks in Arabia quadrangle. Crater is about the size of Earth's Meteor Crater in Arizona.

Some parts of Mars show inverted relief. This occurs when materials are deposited on the floor of a stream and then become resistant to erosion, perhaps by cementation. Later, the area may be buried. Eventually, erosion removes the covering layer. The former streams become visible since they are resistant to erosion. Mars Global Surveyor found several examples of this process. Many inverted streams have been discovered in various regions of Mars, especially in the Medusae Fossae Formation, Miyamoto Crater, and the Juventae Plateau.

The image below shows one example.

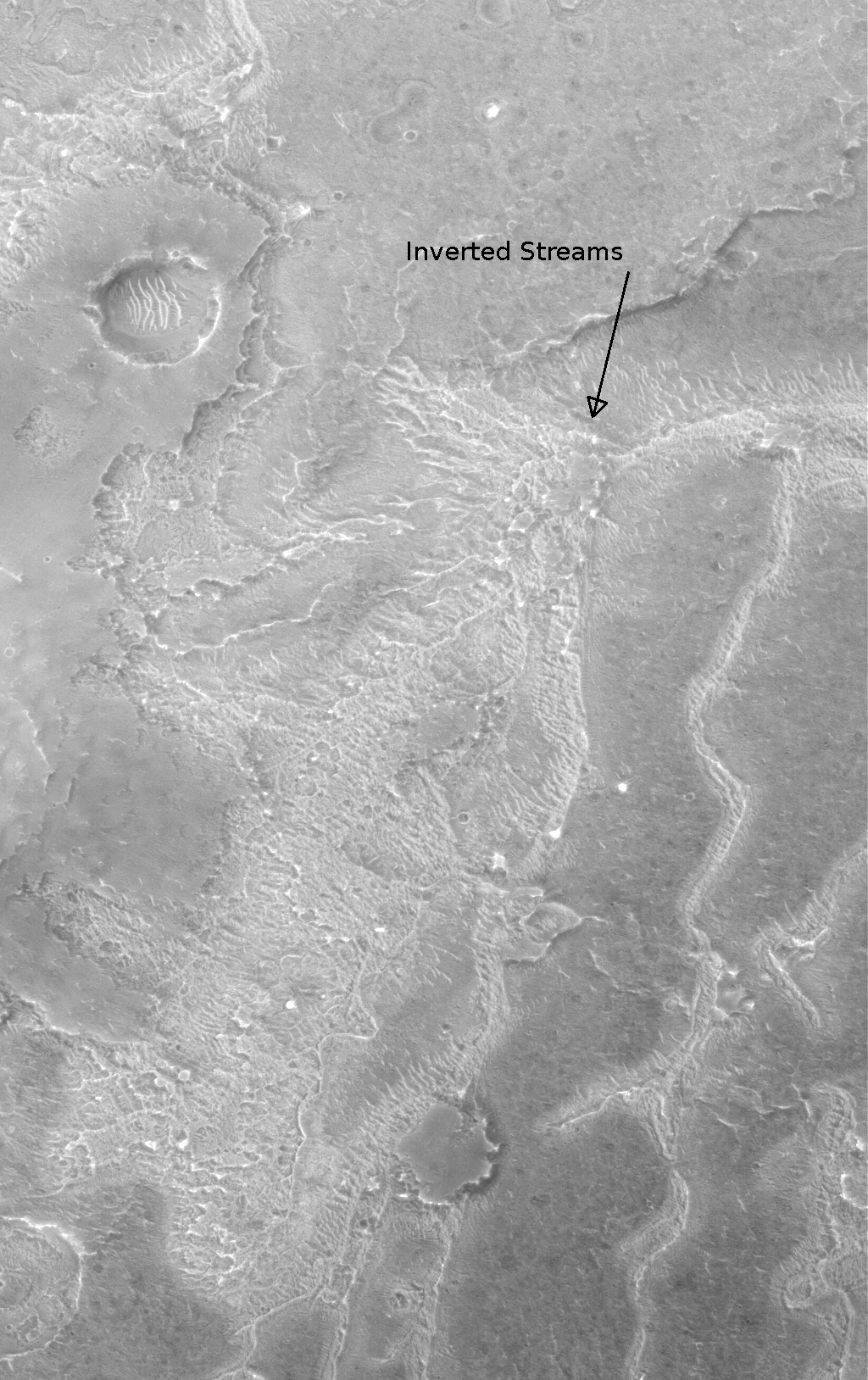
Inverted Streams near Juventae Chasma, as seen by Mars Global Surveyor. These streams begin at the top of a ridge then run together.

== Mars Pathfinder ==
Pathfinder found temperatures varied on a diurnal cycle. It was coldest just before sunrise (about −78 Celsius) and warmest just after Mars noon (about −8 Celsius). These extremes occurred near the ground, which both warmed up and cooled down fastest. At this location, the highest temperature never reached the freezing point of water (0 °C), so Mars Pathfinder confirmed that where it landed, it is too cold for liquid water to exist. However, water could exist as a liquid if it were mixed with various salts.

Surface pressures varied diurnally over a 0.2 millibar range, but showed 2 daily minima and two daily maxima. The average daily pressure decreased from about 6.75 millibars to a low of just under 6.7 millibars, corresponding to when the maximum amount of carbon dioxide had condensed on the south pole. The pressure on Earth is generally close to 1000 millibars, so the pressure on Mars is very low. The pressures measured by Pathfinder would not permit water or ice to exist on the surface. However, if ice were insulated with a layer of soil, it could last a long time.

Other observations were consistent with water being present in the past. Some of the rocks at the Mars Pathfinder site leaned against each other in a manner geologists term imbricated. It is believed that strong flood waters in the past pushed the rocks around until they faced away from the flow. Some pebbles were rounded, perhaps from being tumbled in a stream. Parts of the ground are crusty, maybe due to cementing by a fluid containing minerals.

There was evidence of clouds and maybe fog.

== Mars Odyssey ==
Mars Odyssey's Gamma Ray Spectrometer (GRS) had discovered huge amounts of water over vast areas of Mars. In both hemispheres, from 55 degrees latitude to the poles, Mars has a high density of ice just beneath the surface; one kilogram of soil contains about 500 g of water ice. But, close to the equator, there is only 2 to 10% of water in the soil. Scientists believe that much of this water is locked up in the chemical structure of minerals, such as clay and sulfates. Previous studies with infrared spectroscopes have provided evidence of small amounts of chemically or physically bound water. The Viking landers detected low levels of chemically bound water in the Martian soil. It is believed that although the upper surface only contains a percent or so of water, ice may lie just a few feet deeper. Some areas, Arabia Terra, Amazonis quadrangle, and Elysium quadrangle, contain large amounts of water. Analysis of the data suggests that the southern hemisphere may have a layered structure. Both poles showed buried ice, but the North Pole had none close to it because it was covered by seasonal carbon dioxide (dry ice). When the measurements were gathered, it was winter at the North Pole, so carbon dioxide had frozen on top of the water ice. There may be much more water further below the surface; the instruments aboard the Mars Odyssey are only able to study the top meter or so of soil. If all holes in the soil were filled by water, this would correspond to a global layer of water 0.5 to 1.5 km deep.

The Phoenix lander confirmed the initial findings of the Mars Odyssey. It found ice a few inches below the surface, and the ice is at least 8 inches deep. When the ice is exposed to the Martian atmosphere, it slowly sublimates. In fact, some of the ice was exposed by the landing rockets of the craft.

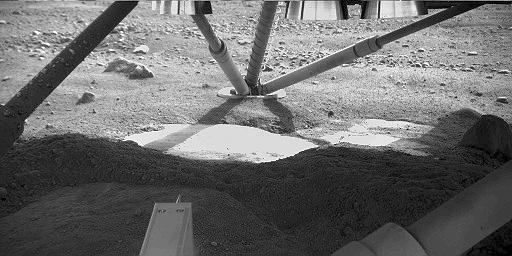
View underneath Phoenix lander towards south foot pad, showing patchy exposures of a bright surface that was later proven to be water ice, as predicted by theory and detected by Mars Odyssey.

Thousands of images returned from Mars Odyssey support the idea that Mars once had great amounts of water flowing across its surface. Some pictures show patterns of branching valleys. Others show layers that may have formed under lakes. Deltas have been identified.

For many years, researchers believed that glaciers existed under a layer of insulating rocks. Lineated deposits are one example of these probable rock-covered glaciers. They are found on the floors of some channels. Their surfaces have ridged and grooved materials that deflect around obstacles. Some glaciers on Earth show such features. Lineated floor deposits may be related to lobate debris aprons, which have been proven to contain large amounts of ice by orbiting radar.

The pictures below, taken with the THEMIS instrument on board the Mars Odyssey, show examples of features associated with water present in the present or past.

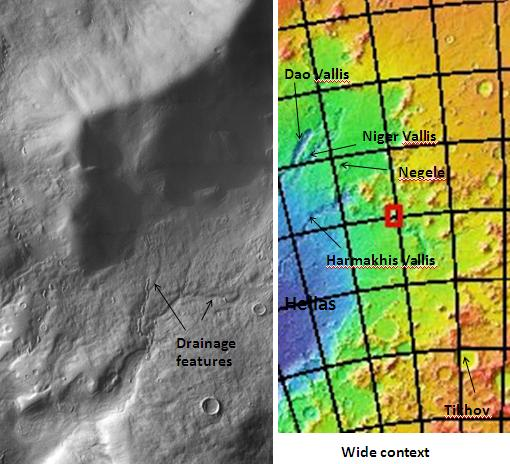
Drainage features in Reull Vallis. Click on image to see relationship of Reull Vallis to other features. Location is Hellas quadrangle.

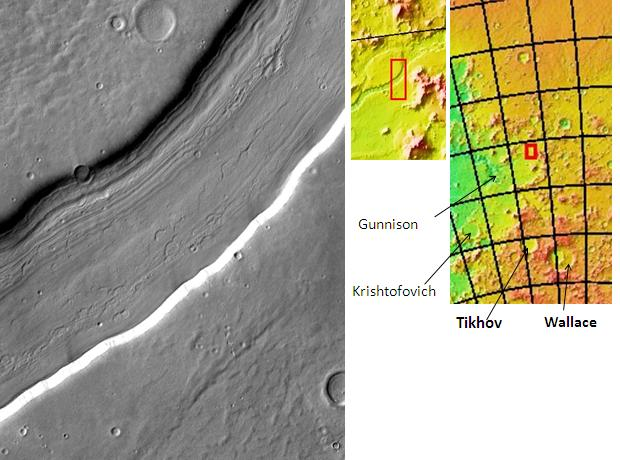
Reull Vallis with lineated floor deposits. Click on image to see relationship to other features. Floor deposits are believed to be formed from ice movement. Location is Hellas quadrangle.

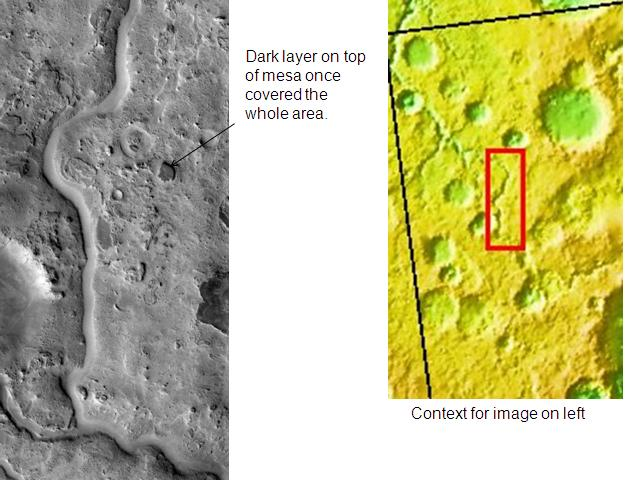
Auqakuh Vallis. At one time a dark layer covered the whole area, now only a few pieces remain as buttes. Click on image to see layers. Layers may have formed from deposition on the bottom of lakes.

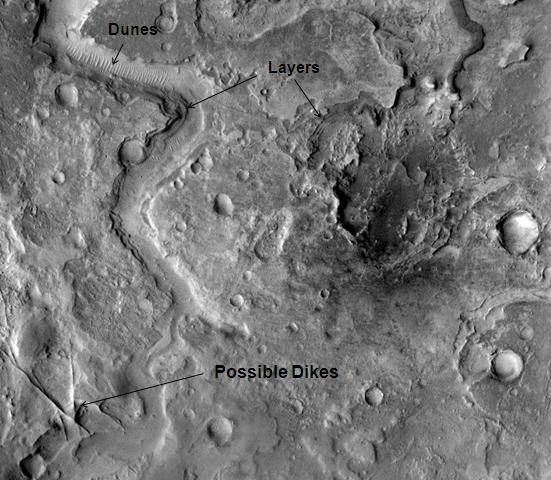
Huo Hsing Vallis in Syrtis Major quadrangle. Straight ridges may be dikes in which liquid rock once flowed.

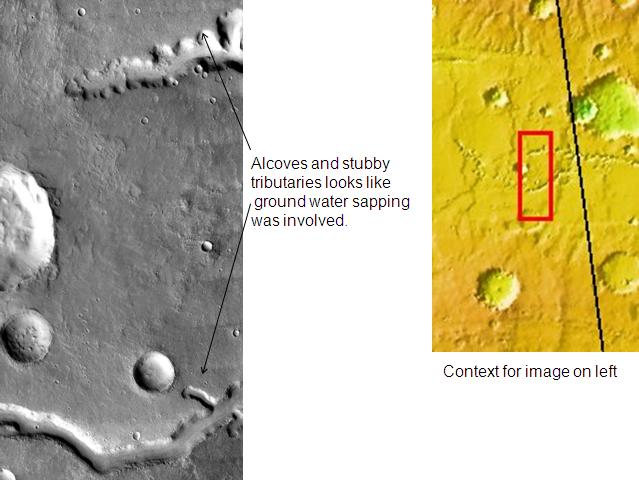
Nirgal Vallis that runs in two quadrangles has features looking like those caused by sapping. Nirgal Vallis is one of many ancient river valleys studied by THEMIS.

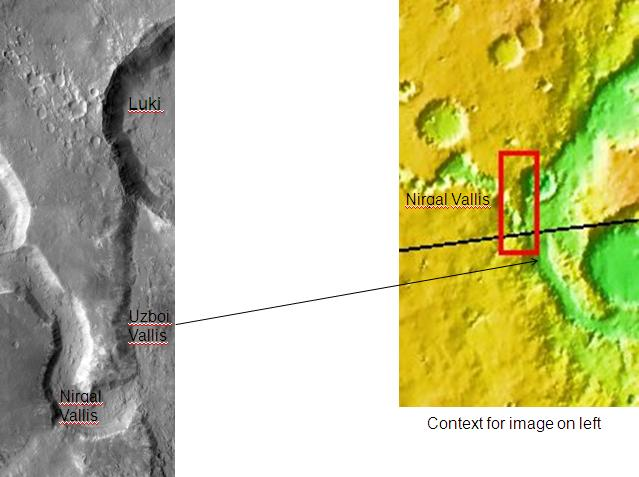
The long channel Nirgal Vallis is shown where it connects to Uzboi Vallis. The crater Luki is 21 km in diameter.

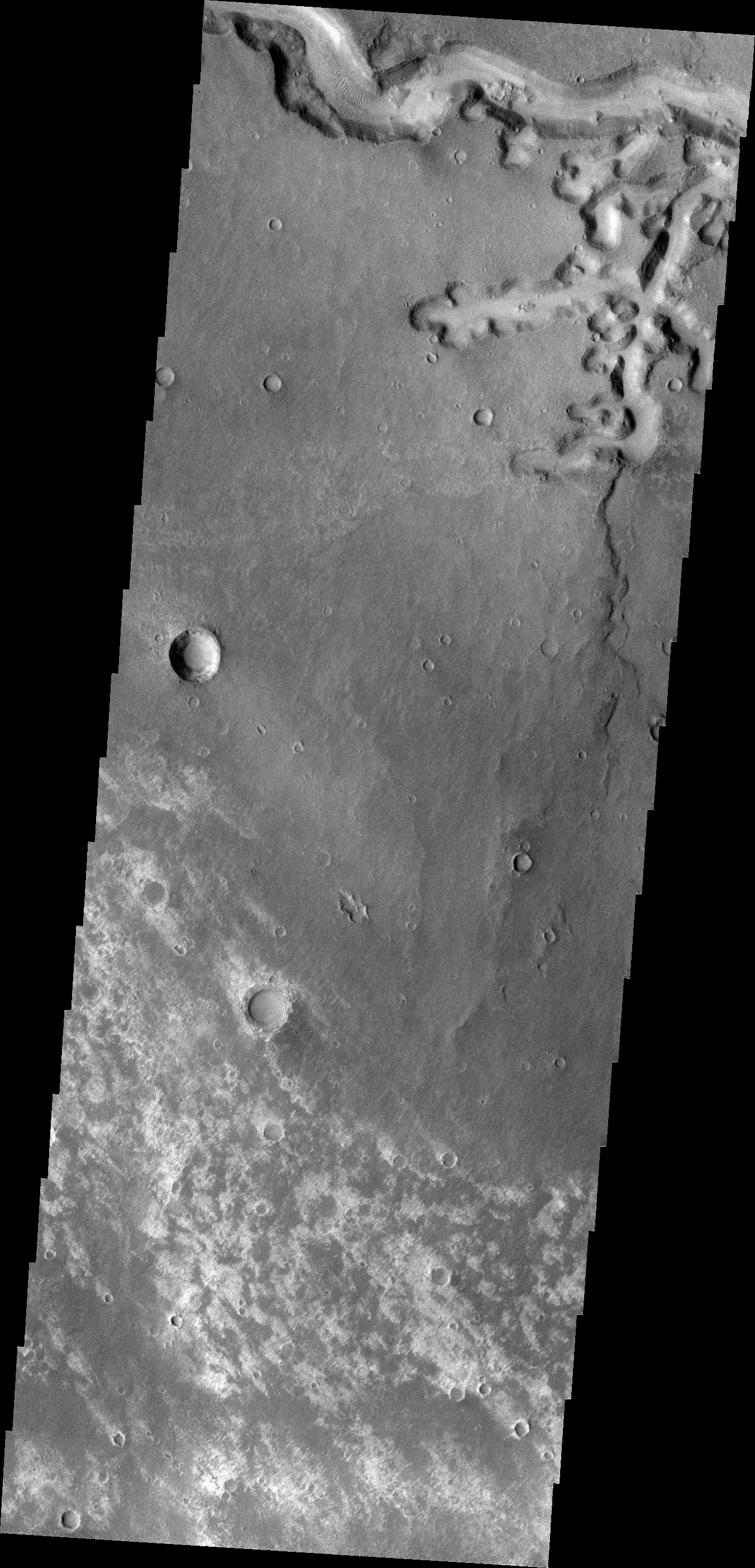
Nirgal Vallis.

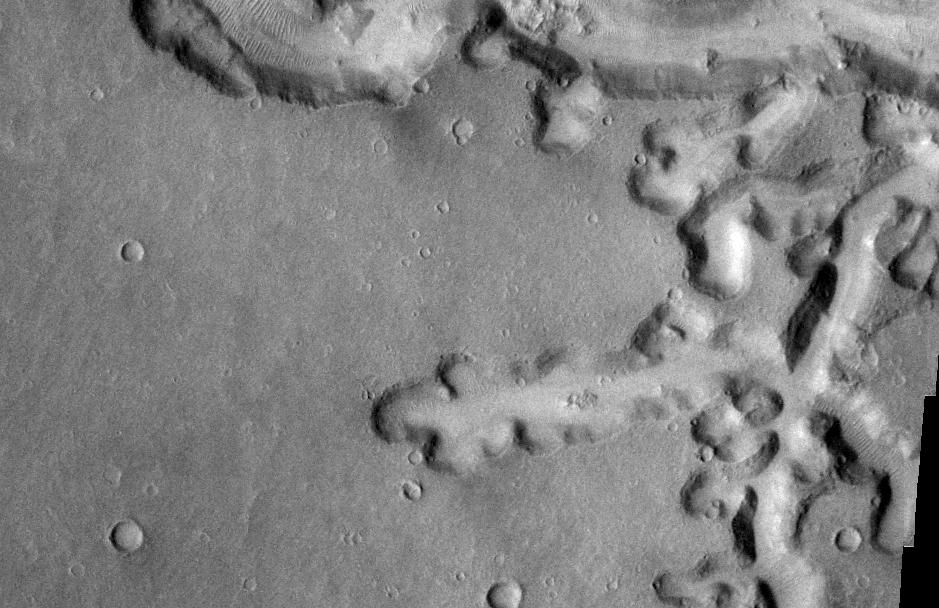
Nirgal Vallis close-up.

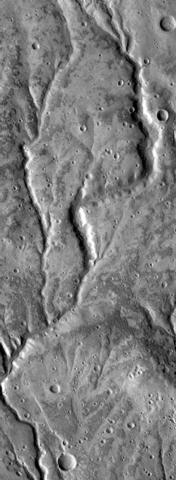
Channels near Warrego Valles. These branched channels are strong evidence for flowing water on Mars, perhaps during a much warmer period.

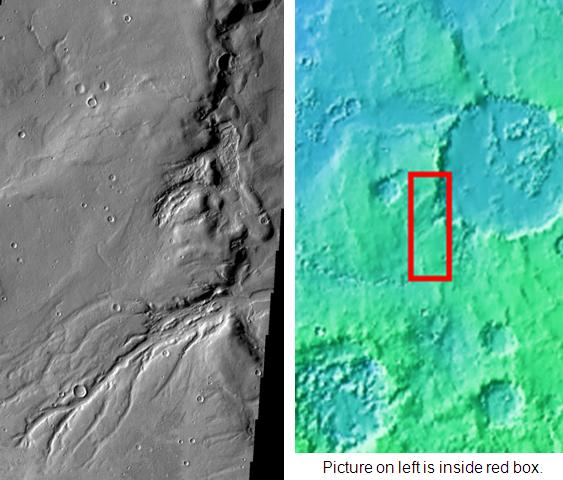
Semeykin Crater Drainage. Click on image to see details of beautiful drainage system. Location is Ismenius Lacus quadrangle.

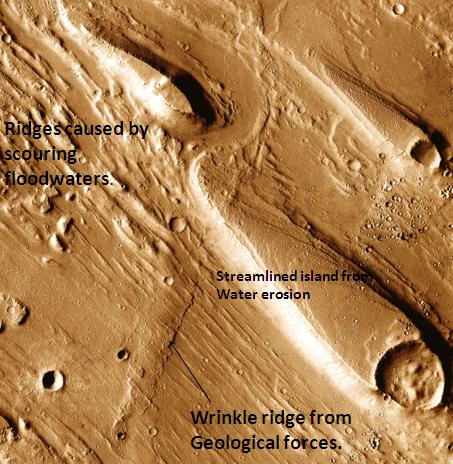
Erosion features in Ares Vallis – the streamlined shape was probably formed by running water.

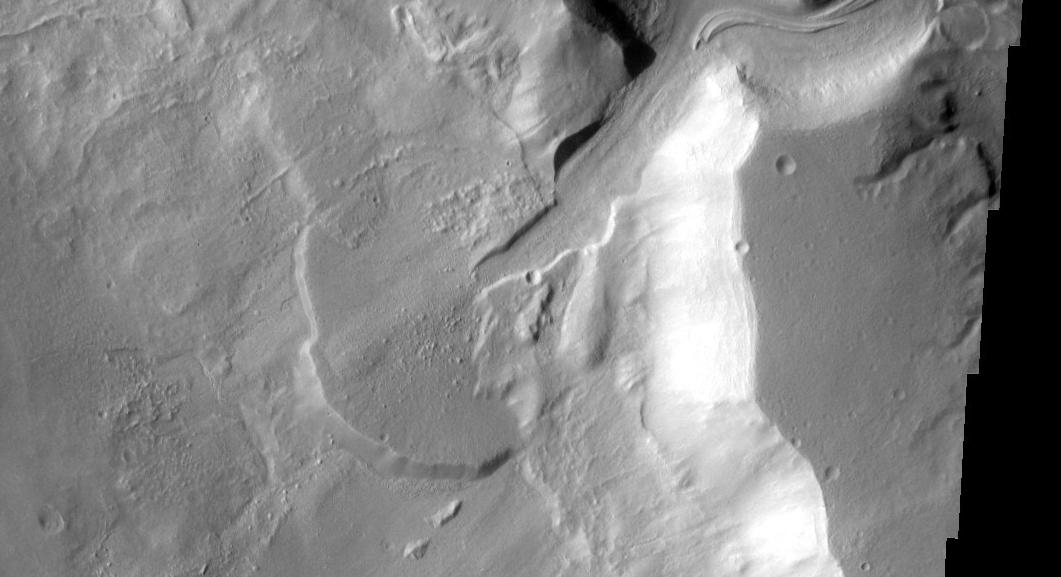
Delta in Ismenius Lacus quadrangle.

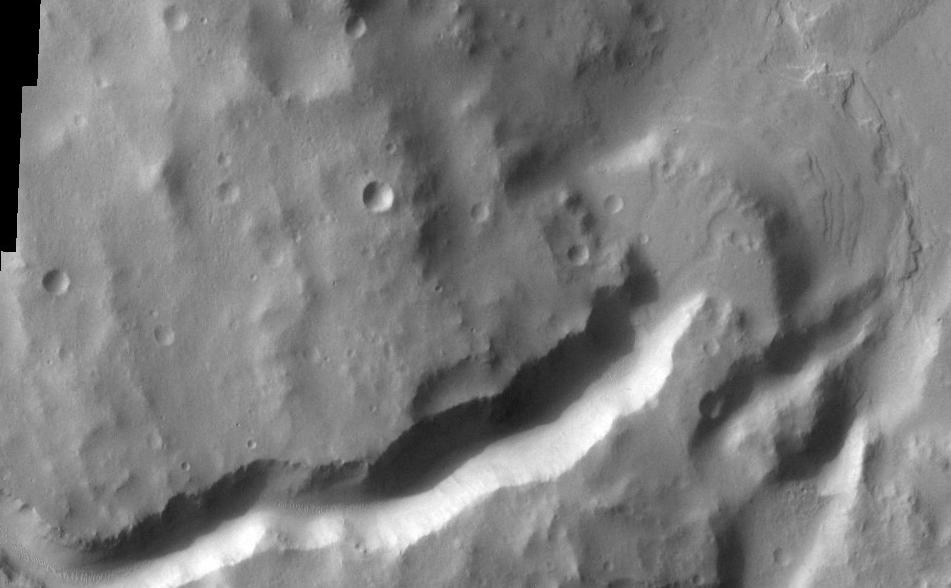
Delta in Lunae Palus quadrangle.

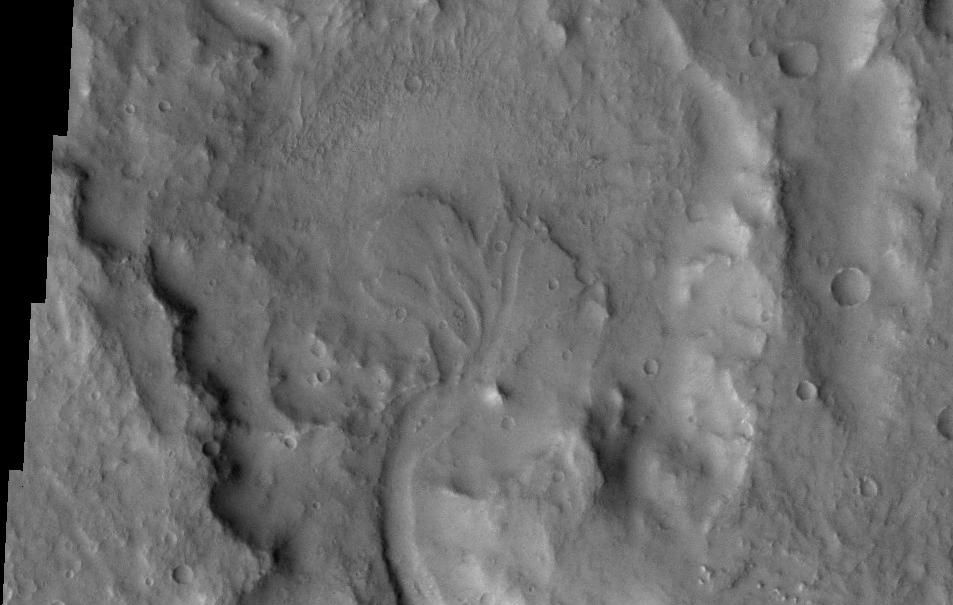
Delta in Margaritifer Sinus quadrangle.

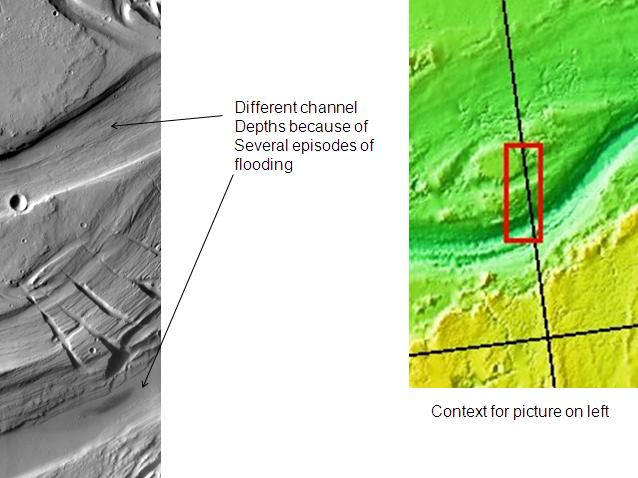
Kasei Vallis.

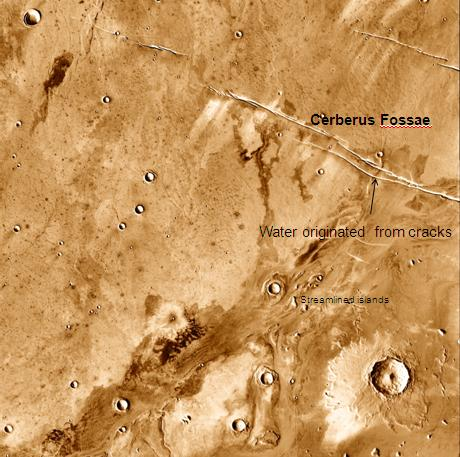
Athabasca Valles showing source of its water, Cerberus Fossae. Note streamlined islands which show direction of flow to south. Athabasca Valles is in the Elysium quadrangle.

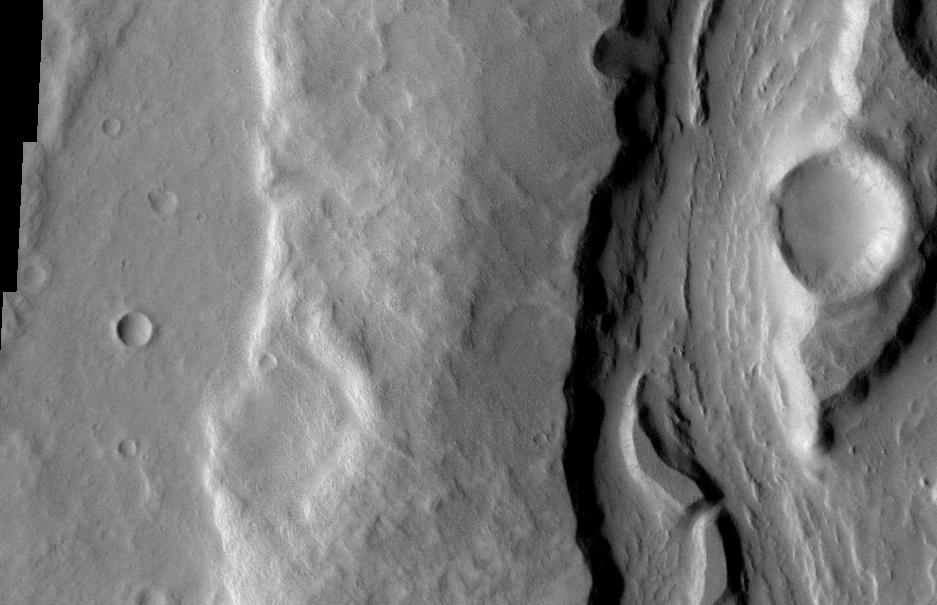
Close-up of Padus Vallis in the Memnonia quadrangle.

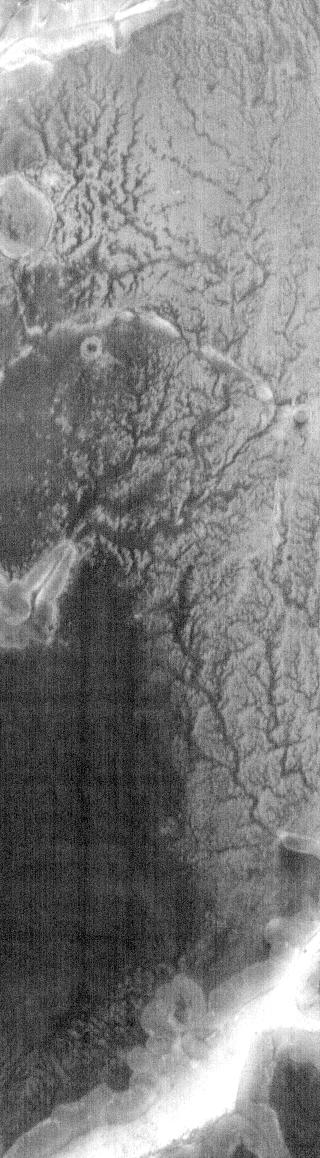
Channels west of Echus Chasma. The fine pattern of branching valleys were probably formed by water moving across the surface. Image is in Coprates quadrangle.

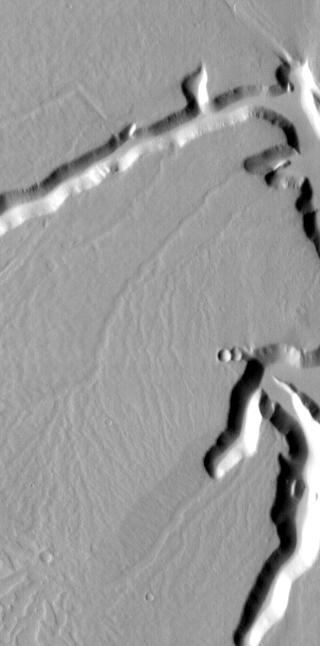
Dendritic channels on mesa of Echus Chasma. Image is 20 miles wide. Image is in Coprates quadrangle.

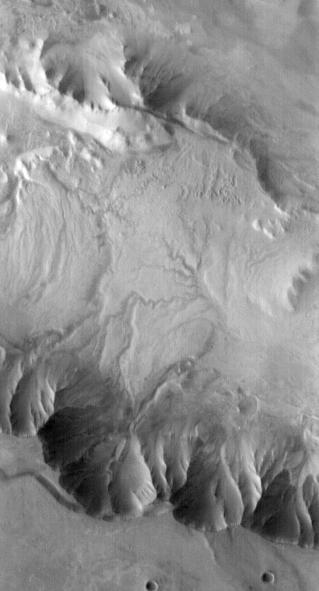
Branching channels on floor of Melas Chasma. Image is in Coprates quadrangle.

Much of the surface of Mars is covered by a thick, smooth mantle that is thought to be a mixture of ice and dust.

Changes in Mars's orbit and tilt cause significant changes in the distribution of water ice. During certain climate periods, water vapor leaves polar ice and enters the atmosphere. The water returns to the ground at lower latitudes as deposits of frost or snow mixed generously with dust. The atmosphere of Mars contains a great deal of fine dust particles. Water vapor condenses on the particles, then they fall down to the ground due to the additional weight of the water coating. When ice at the top of the mantling layer returns to the atmosphere, it leaves behind dust, which insulates the remaining ice.

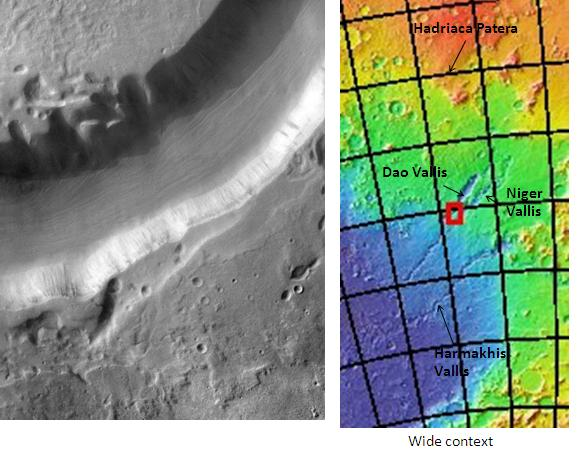

Dao Vallis begins near a large volcano, called Hadriaca Patera, so it is thought to have received water when hot magma melted huge amounts of ice in the frozen ground. The partially circular depressions on the left side of the channel in the image above suggests that groundwater sapping also contributed water.

In some areas, large river valleys begin with a landscape feature called "chaos" or chaotic terrain". It is thought that the ground collapsed, as huge amounts of water were suddenly released. Examples of chaotic terrain, as imaged by THEMIS, are shown below.

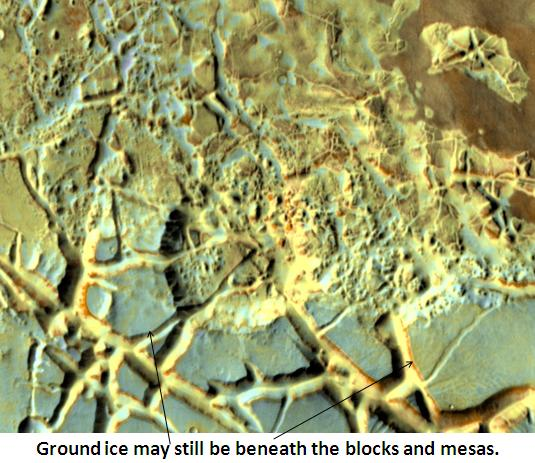
Blocks in Aram Chaos showing possible source of water. The ground collapsed when large amounts of water were released. The large blocks probably still contain some water ice. Location is Oxia Palus quadrangle.

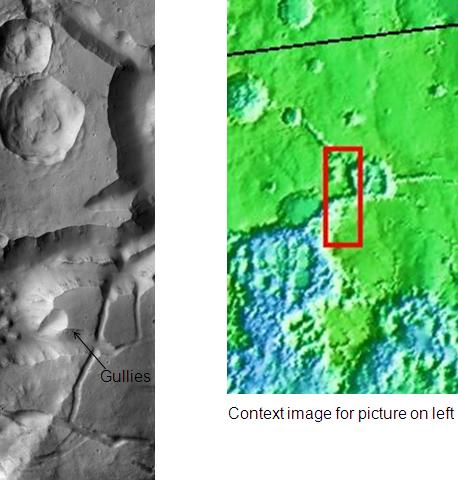
Huge canyons in Aureum Chaos. Click on image to see the gullies which may have formed from recent flows of water. Gullies are rare at this latitude. Location is Margaritifer Sinus quadrangle.

== Mars Express ==
ESA's Mars Express, which entered orbit in December 2003, made several water-related discoveries. Its OMEGA visible and infrared spectrometer provided the first direct confirmation of water ice at the Martian south pole, detecting perennial deposits of water ice mixed into the soil as permafrost surrounding the carbon dioxide ice cap. OMEGA also mapped three classes of hydrated minerals across the surface (phyllosilicates, sulfates, and ferric oxides), enabling researchers to reconstruct distinct eras of Martian water chemistry. The MARSIS subsurface radar, the first such instrument to orbit another planet, measured the polar ice caps to be up to 3.5 km thick and composed predominantly of water ice beneath a thin layer of carbon dioxide. In 2018, MARSIS data was interpreted as evidence for a subglacial lake roughly 20 km wide beneath the south polar ice cap, though this finding remains debated. In 2024, further MARSIS analysis revealed that deposits within the Medusae Fossae Formation near the equator contain large quantities of water ice extending to depths of 3.7 km; if melted, this ice would cover the entire planet in a layer of water 1.5 to 2.7 m deep.

== Phoenix ==
The Phoenix lander confirmed the existence of large amounts of water ice in the northern regions of Mars. This finding was predicted by theory. and was measured from orbit by the Mars Odyssey instruments. On June 19, 2008, NASA announced that dice-sized clumps of bright material in the "Dodo-Goldilocks" trench, dug by the robotic arm, had vaporized over the course of four days, strongly implying that the bright clumps were composed of water ice which sublimated following exposure. Even though dry ice also sublimates under the conditions present, it would do so at a rate much faster than observed.

On July 31, 2008, NASA announced that Phoenix confirmed the presence of water ice on Mars. During the initial heating cycle of a new sample, the Thermal and Evolved-Gas Analyzer's (TEGA) mass spectrometer detected water vapor when the sample temperature reached 0 °C. Liquid water cannot exist on the surface of Mars with its present low atmospheric pressure, except at the lowest elevations for short periods.

Chloride, bicarbonate, magnesium, sodium, potassium, calcium, and possibly sulfate were detected in the samples. Perchlorate (ClO_{4}), a strong oxidizer, was confirmed to be in the soil. When mixed with water, it can greatly lower freezing points. Perchlorate may be allowing small amounts of liquid water to form on Mars today. Gullies, which are common in certain areas of Mars, may have formed from perchlorate melting ice, causing water to erode soil on steep slopes.

In 2008–2009, a debate emerged within NASA over the presence of 'blobs' which appeared on photos of the vehicle's landing struts, which have been variously described as being either water droplets or 'clumps of frost'. Due to the lack of consensus within the Phoenix team, the issue had not been raised in any NASA news conferences. One idea was that the lander's thrusters splashed a pocket of brine from just below the Martian surface onto the landing strut during the vehicle's landing. The salts would then have absorbed water vapor from the air, which would have explained how they appeared to grow in size during the first 44 Martian days before slowly evaporating as Mars temperature dropped. Some images even suggest that some of the droplets darkened, then moved and merged; this is strong physical evidence that they were liquid.

Dice-sized clumps of bright material in the enlarged "Dodo-Goldilocks" trench vanished over the course of four days, implying that they were composed of ice which sublimated following exposure.

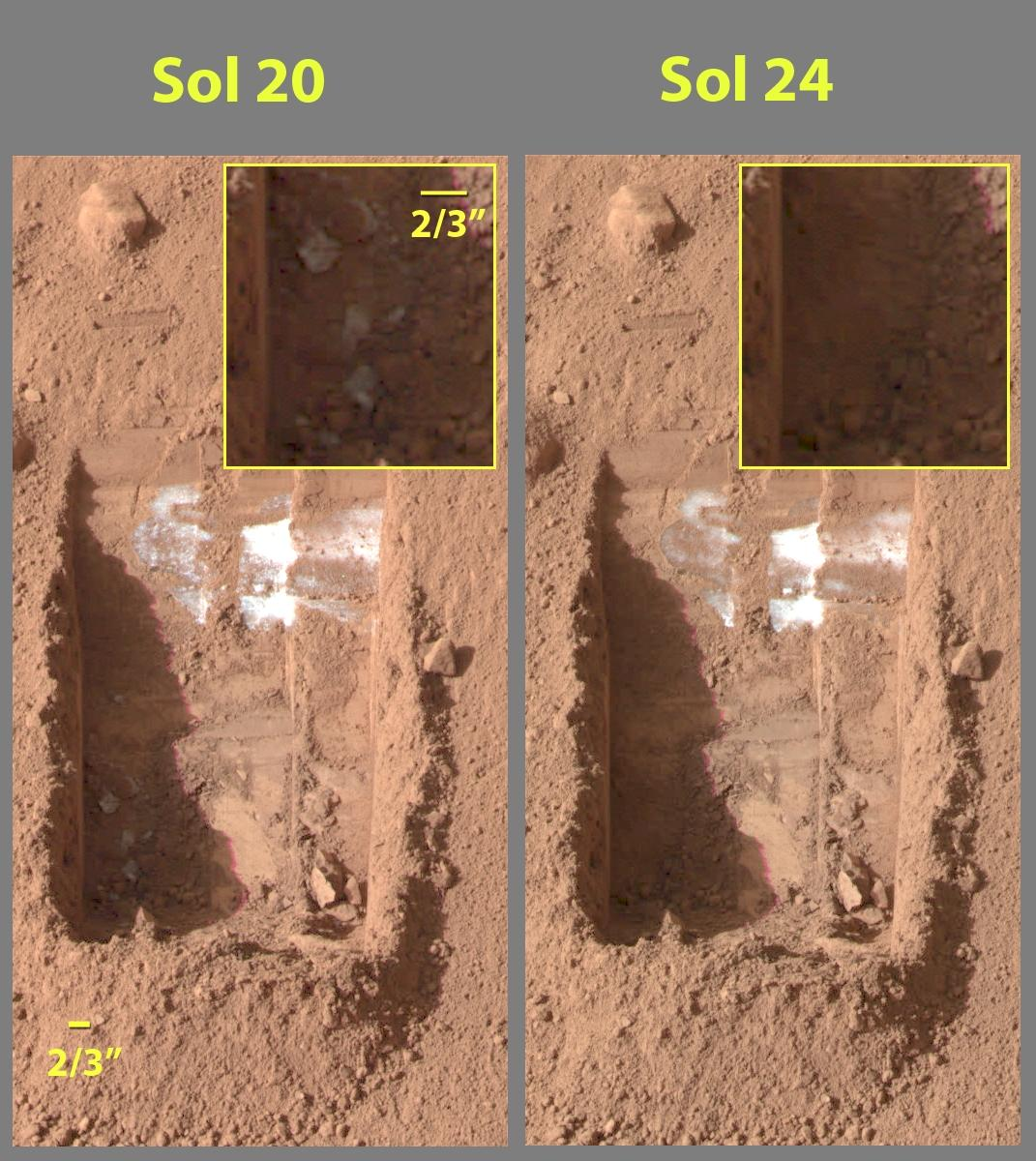
Color versions of the photos showing ice sublimation, with the lower left corner of the trench enlarged in the insets in the upper right of the images.

For about as far as the camera can see, the land is flat, but shaped into polygons between 2–3 meters in diameter and is bounded by troughs that are 20 cm to 50 cm deep. These shapes are due to ice in the soil expanding and contracting due to major temperature changes.

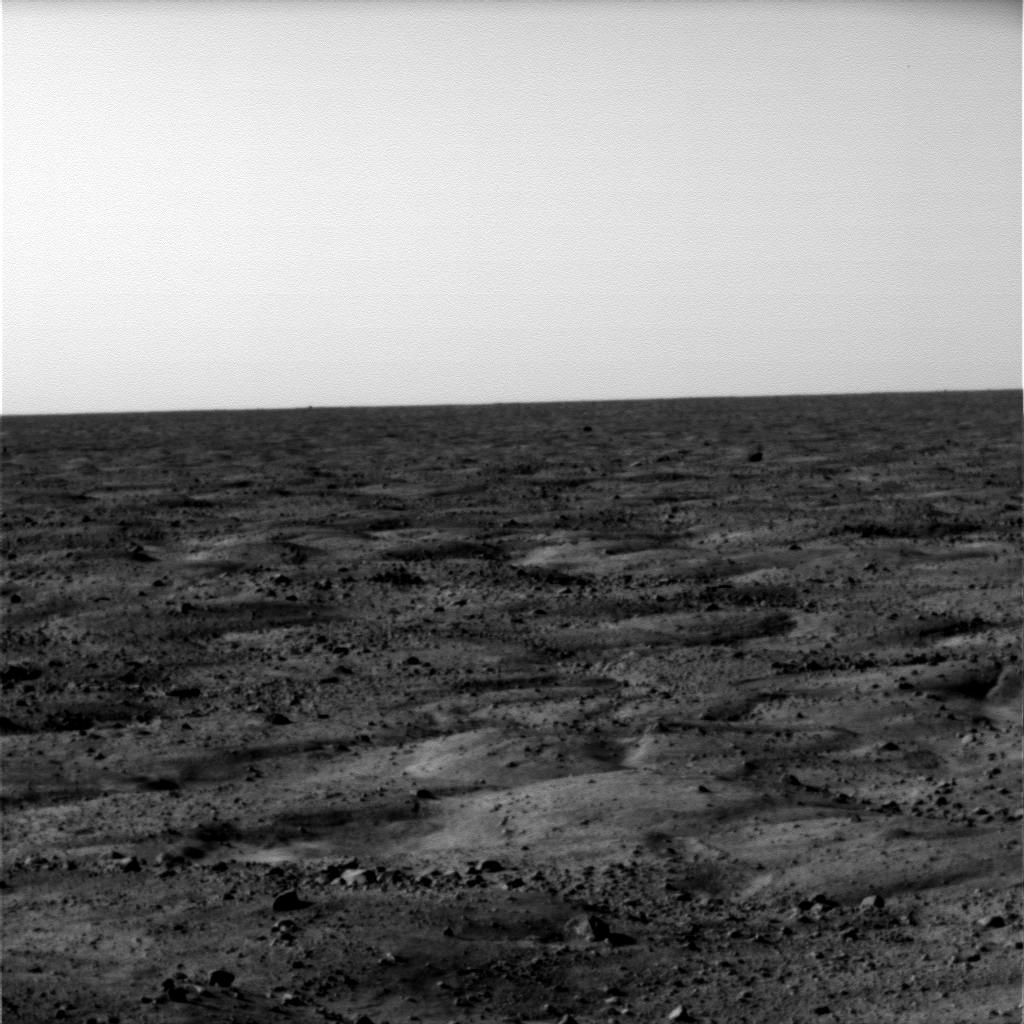
Comparison between polygons photographed by Phoenix on Mars...

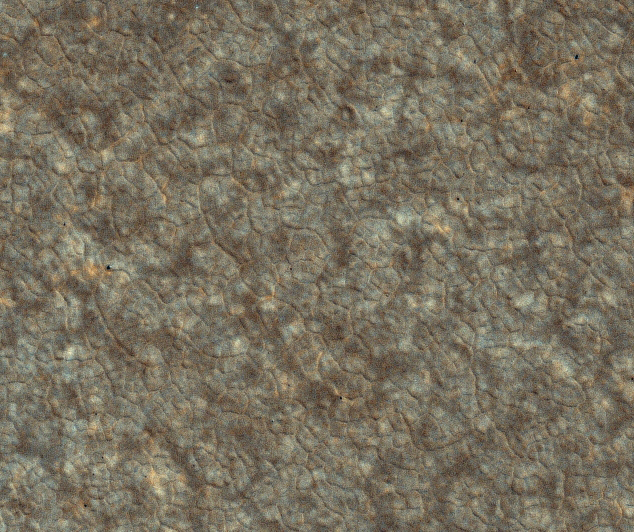
... and as photographed (in false color) from Mars orbit...

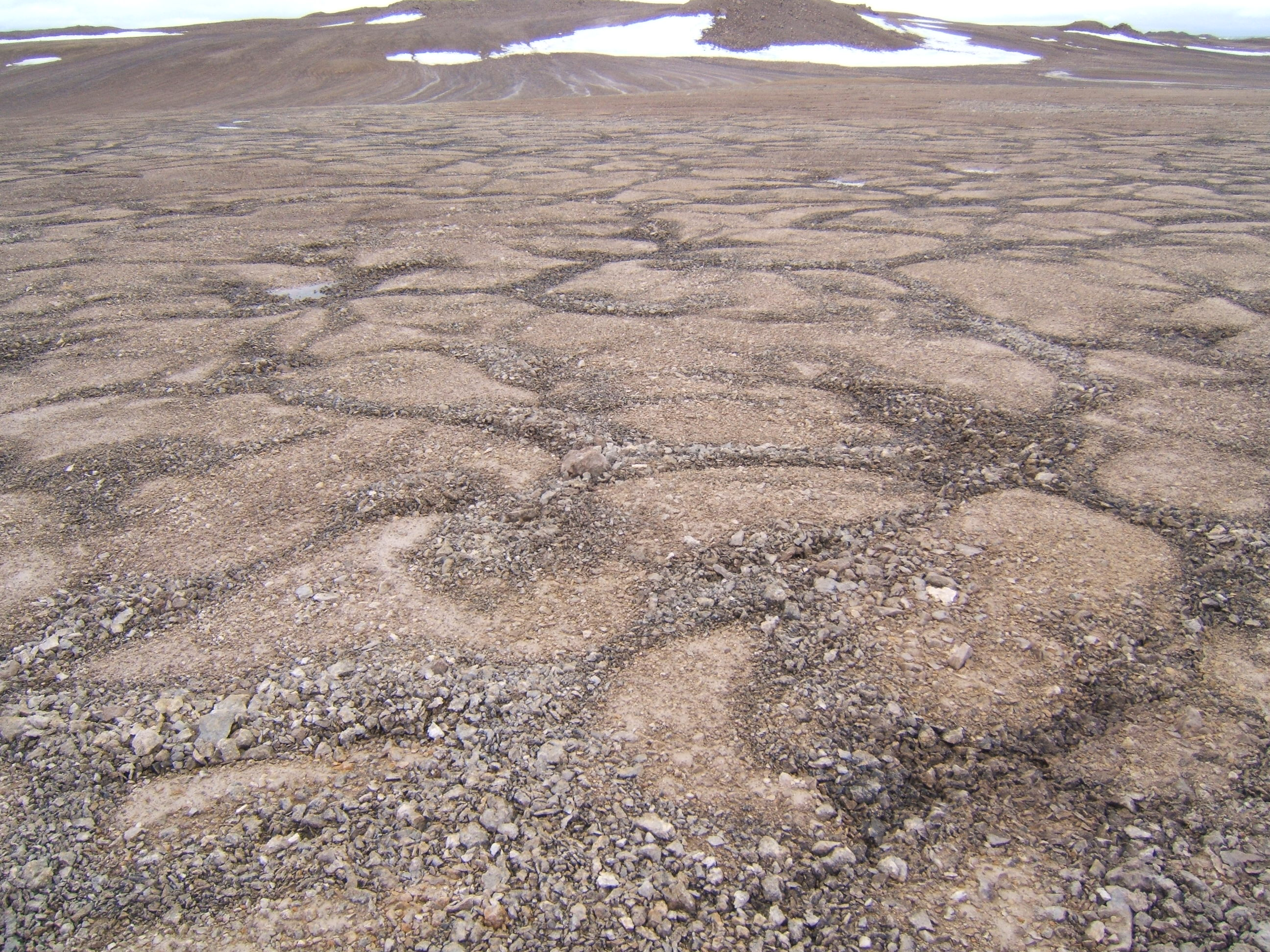
... with patterned ground on Devon Island in the Canadian Arctic, on Earth.

The microscope showed that the soil on top of the polygons is composed of flat particles (probably a type of clay) and rounded particles. Clay forms when water is available. Ice is present a few inches below the surface in the middle of the polygons, and along its edges, the ice is at least 8 inches deep. When the ice is exposed to the Martian atmosphere, it slowly sublimates.

Snow was observed to fall from cirrus clouds. The clouds formed at a level in the atmosphere around −65 °C, so the clouds would have to be composed of water-ice, rather than carbon dioxide-ice (dry ice), because the temperature for forming carbon dioxide ice is much lower, less than −120 °C. As a result of mission observations, it is now believed that water ice (snow) would have accumulated later in the year at this location. The highest temperature measured during the mission was −19.6 °C, while the coldest was −97.7 °C.

The landing site had a wetter and warmer climate in the recent past. Finding calcium carbonate in the Martian soil leads scientists to believe that the site had been wet or damp in the geological past. During seasonal or longer periods, diurnal cycles, water may have been present as thin films. The tilt or obliquity of Mars changes far more than that of Earth; hence, times of higher humidity are probable. The data also confirms the presence of the chemical perchlorate. Perchlorate makes up a few tenths of a percent of the soil samples.

== Mars Exploration Rovers ==
The Mars rovers Spirit and Opportunity found much evidence for past water on Mars. Designed to last only three months, both were still operating after more than six years. Spirit got trapped in a sand pit in 2009, with NASA officially declaring the end of the mission in 2011. Opportunity lost contact with NASA on June 10, 2018, and its mission was declared complete on February 13, 2019.

Spirit landed in what was thought to be a huge lake bed. However, the lake bed had been covered over with lava flows, so evidence of past water was initially hard to detect.

On March 5, 2004, NASA announced that Spirit had found hints of water history on Mars in a rock dubbed "Humphrey". In contrast to the rocks found by the twin rover Opportunity, this one was formed from magma and then acquired bright material in small crevices, which look like crystallized minerals. The minerals could be dissolved in water, which was either carried inside the rock or interacted with it at a later stage, after it formed.

By Sol 390 (Mid-February 2005), as Spirit was advancing towards "Larry's Lookout", it investigated some targets along the way, including the soil target "Paso Robles", which contained the highest amount of salt found on Mars. The soil also contained a high amount of phosphorus in its composition; however, not nearly as high as that of another rock sampled by Spirit, "Wishstone".

As Spirit traveled with a dead wheel in December 2007, pulling the dead wheel behind, the wheel scraped off the upper layer of the Martian soil, uncovering a patch of ground that scientists say shows evidence of a past environment that would have been perfect for microbial life. It is similar to areas on Earth where water or steam from hot springs came into contact with volcanic rocks. The area is extremely rich in silica. The researchers have concluded that the bright material must have been produced in one of two ways: (1) hot-spring deposits produced when water dissolved silica at one location and then carried it to another (i.e., a geyser), or (2) acidic steam rising through cracks in rocks stripped them of their mineral components, leaving silica behind.

Opportunity was directed to a site that had displayed large amounts of hematite from orbit. Hematite often forms from water. When Opportunity landed, layered rocks and marble-like hematite concretions ("blueberries") were easily visible.

Small, elongated voids in the rock, visible on the surface consistent with features known as "vugs". These are formed when crystals form inside a rock matrix and are later removed through erosive processes, leaving behind voids. Some of the features in this picture are "disk-like", which is consistent with certain types of crystals, notably sulfate minerals. The iron spectrum from the Mössbauer spectrometer, taken from the rock El Capitan, shows strong evidence for the mineral jarosite. This mineral contains hydroxide ions, which indicates the presence of water when the minerals were formed. Mini-TES data from the same rock showed that it consists of a considerable amount of sulfates.

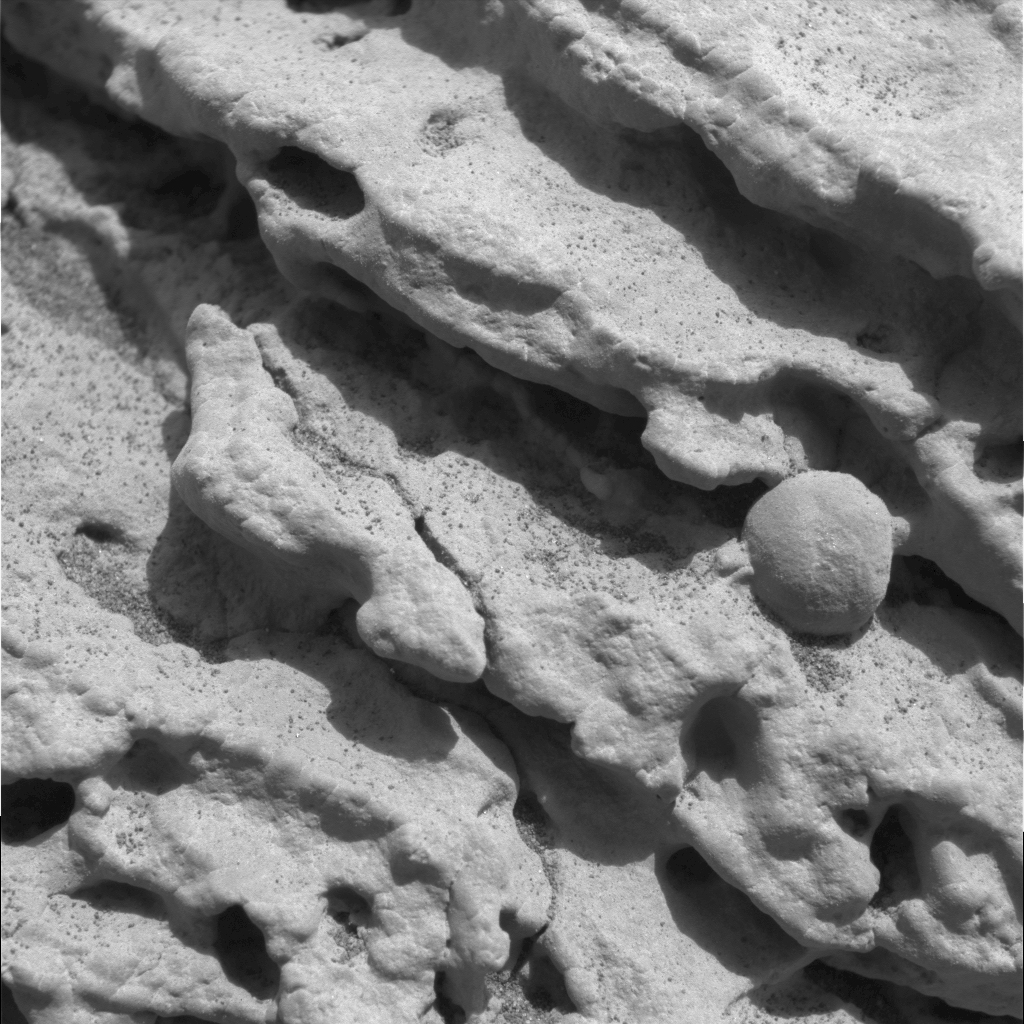
Close-up of a rock outcrop.

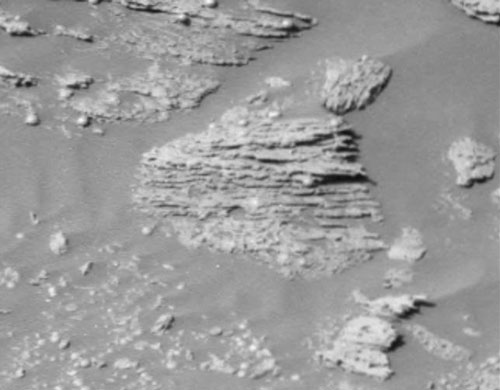
Thin Rock layers, not all parallel to each other

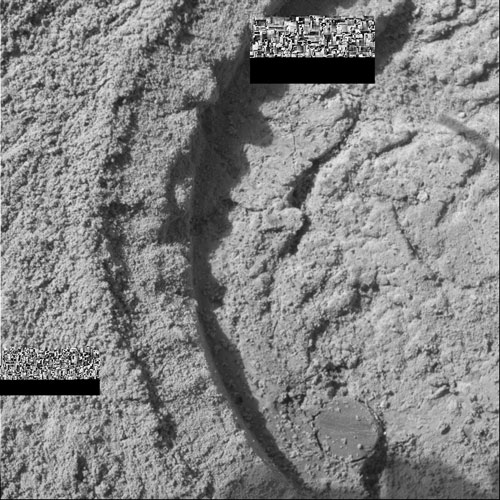
Section of hole created by RAT

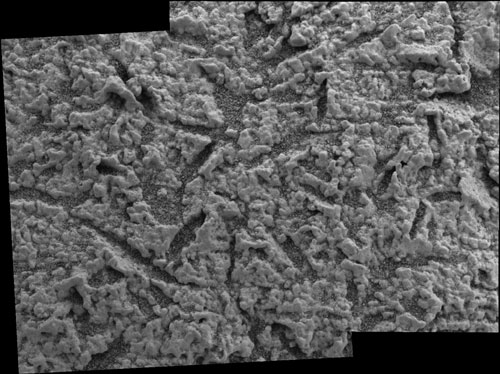
Voids or "vugs" inside the rock

== Curiosity ==
In 2012, NASA's rover Curiosity discovered solid evidence of an ancient streambed that used to flow through the rocks. The rover discovered conglomerates; the shape and size of the pebbles that make up the conglomerates signify that they were eroded by water, perhaps several billion years ago. Satellites used to capture evidence of existing channels, which could indicate running water. This was the first solid major evidence that supported these satellite images.

Curiosity carries a meteorological station called REMS (Rover Environmental Monitoring Station). Data from REMS showed that there are conditions for the presence of liquid water on Mars; salts in the ground can absorb water vapor from the environment.

== MAVEN ==
NASA's MAVEN (Mars Atmosphere and Volatile Evolution) spacecraft, which entered orbit in September 2014, was the first mission dedicated to studying Mars's upper atmosphere and its interaction with the solar wind. Its primary contribution to the Mars water research is quantifying how Mars lost its water to space over geological time. MAVEN measurements showed that hydrogen escape from the upper atmosphere produced when solar ultraviolet light breaks apart water molecules varies by a factor of ten over a Martian year, peaking when the planet is closest to the Sun, and water vapour is lofted rapidly to high altitudes. By measuring the ratio of deuterium to hydrogen (D/H) — which increases as lighter hydrogen preferentially escapes — MAVEN data confirmed that Mars has lost a substantial fraction of its early water inventory to space, consistent with the planet once having had enough water to sustain surface lakes or a shallow ocean. MAVEN also demonstrated that global dust storms dramatically accelerate water loss by injecting water vapour directly into the upper atmosphere, bypassing the usual slow diffusion process.

== Mars Reconnaissance Orbiter ==
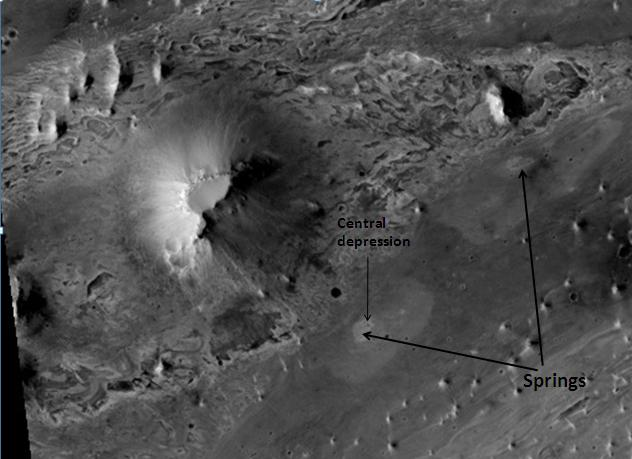
Springs in Vernal Crater, as seen by HiRISE. Location is Oxia Palus quadrangle.

The Mars Reconnaissance Orbiter's HiRISE instrument has taken many images that strongly suggest Mars has had a rich history of water-related processes. A major discovery was finding evidence of hot springs.

Strong evidence for sustained precipitation in the area around Valles Marineris was reported in 2010. The types of minerals are associated with water. The high density of small branching channels indicates a high level of precipitation because they are similar to stream channels on Earth.

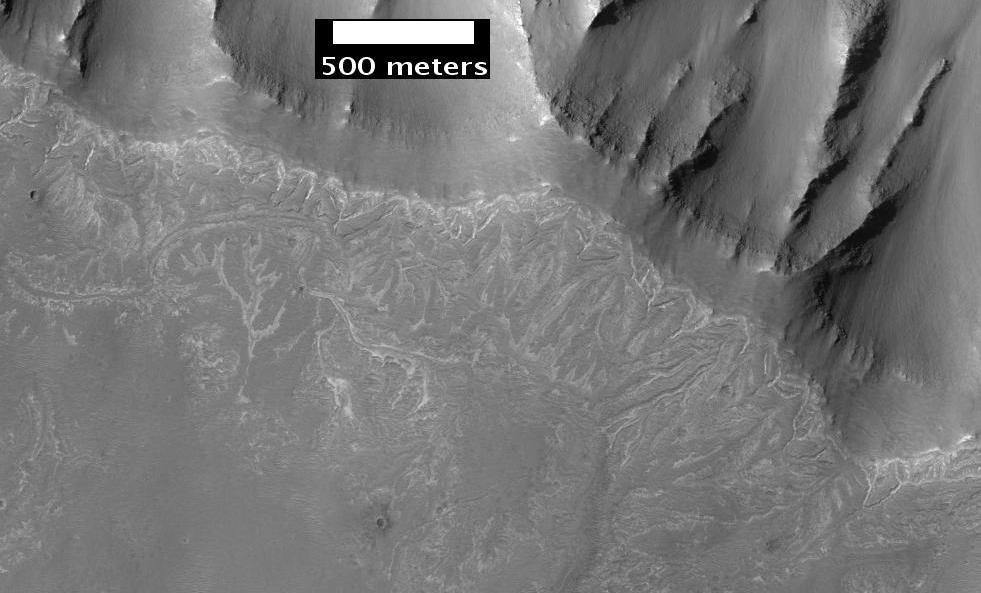
Channels near the rim of Ius Chasma, as seen by HiRISE. The pattern and high density of these channels support precipitation as the source of the water. Location is Coprates quadrangle.

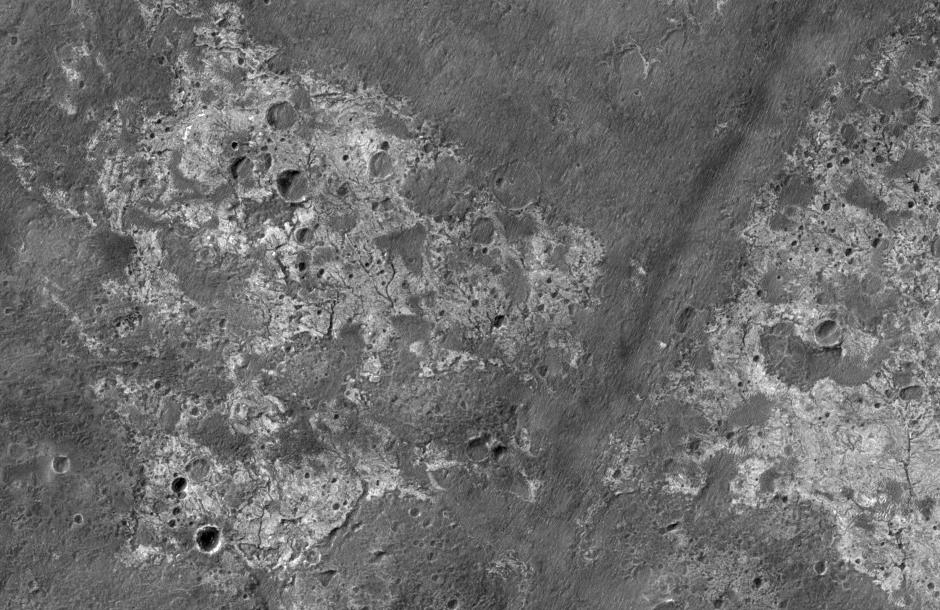
Channels in Candor plateau, as seen by HiRISE. Location is Coprates quadrangle. Click on image to see many small, branched channels which are strong evidence for sustained precipitation.

Some places on Mars show inverted relief. In these locations, a stream bed appears as a raised feature, instead of a depression. The inverted former stream channels may be caused by the deposition of large rocks or due to the cementation of loose materials. In either case, erosion would erode the surrounding land and consequently leave the old channel as a raised ridge because the ridge will be more resistant to erosion.

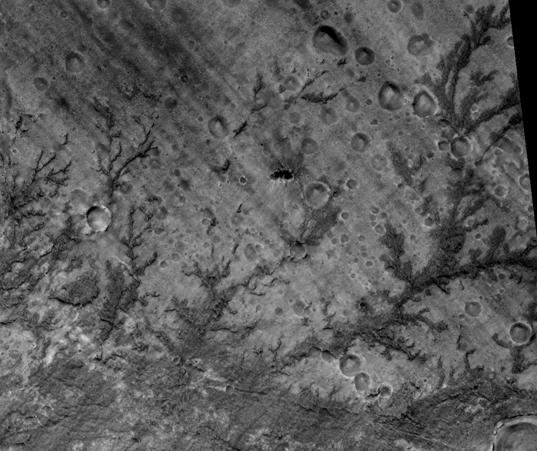
Inverted Stream Channels in Antoniadi Crater. Location is Syrtis Major quadrangle.

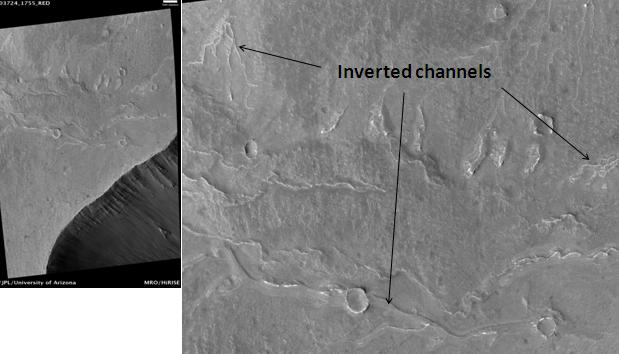
Inverted Channels near Juventae Chasma. Channels were once regular stream channels. Scale bar is 500 meters long. Location is Coprates quadrangle.

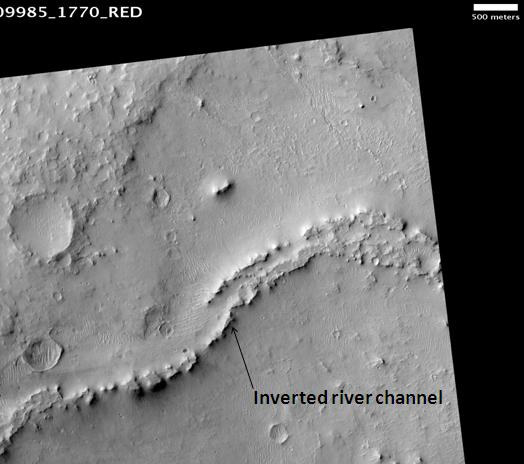
Inverted Channel in Miyamoto Crater in Margaritifer Sinus quadrangle. The scale bar is 500 meters long.

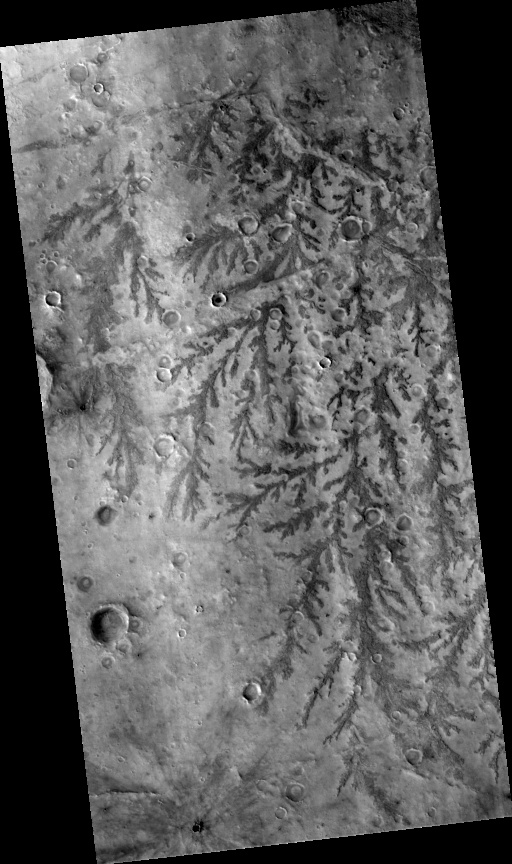
Inverted Channel with many branches in Syrtis Major quadrangle.

Using data from Mars Global Surveyor, Mars Odyssey, and the Mars Reconnaissance Orbiter, widespread deposits of chloride minerals were found. Evidence suggests that the deposits were formed from the evaporation of mineral-enriched waters. Lakes may have been scattered over large areas of the Martian surface. Carbonates, sulfates, and silica should precipitate out ahead of them. Sulfates and silica have been discovered by the Mars rovers.

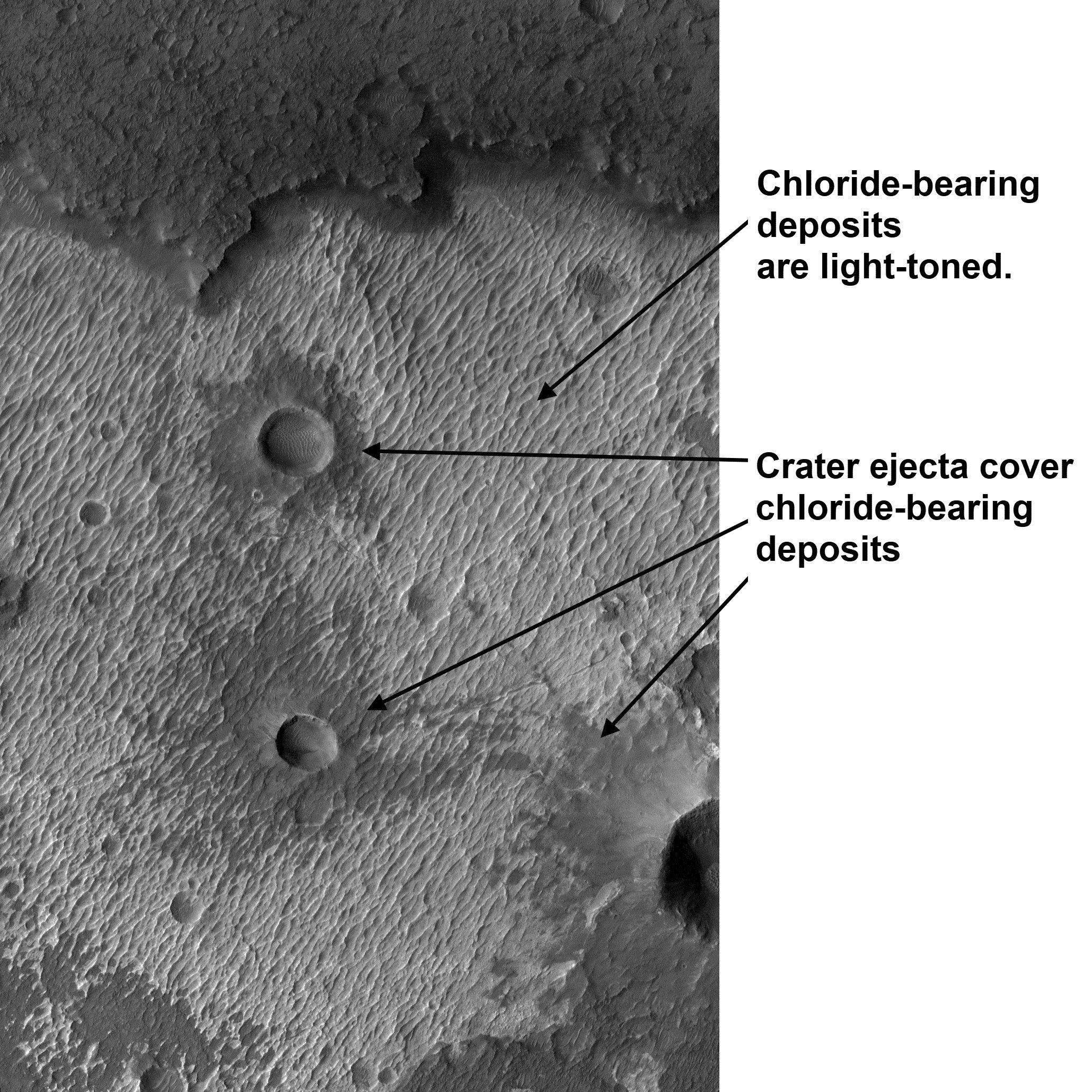
Evidence of water from chloride deposits in Phaethontis quadrangle. Picture from HiRISE.

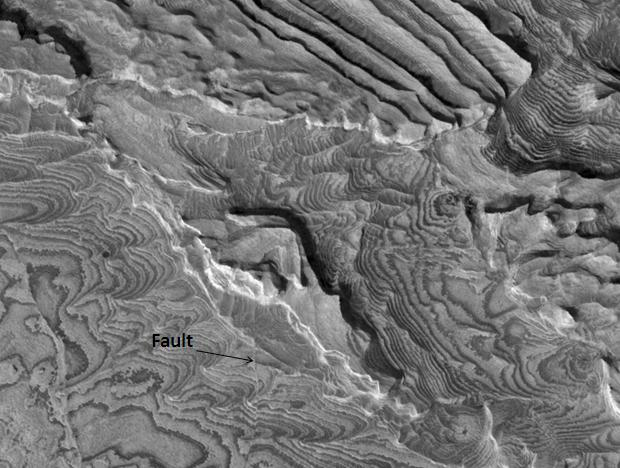
Becquerel Crater layers. Click on image to see fault. Location is Oxia Palus quadrangle.

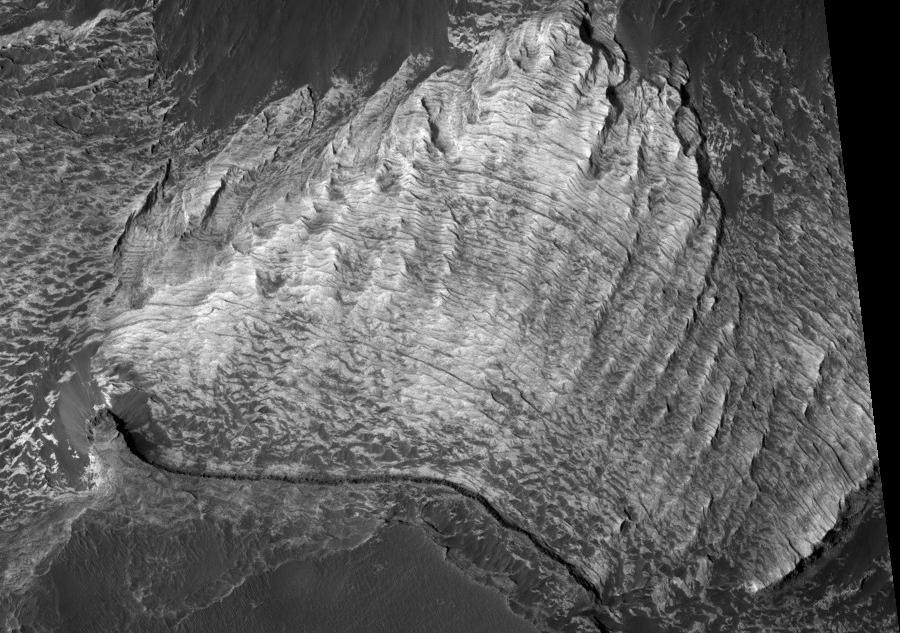
Light colored layers in Eos Chaos. Location is Coprates quadrangle.

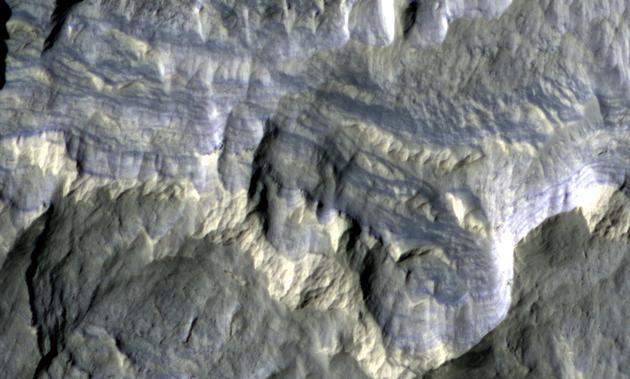
Columbus Crater Layers. This false-color image is about 800 feet across. Some of the layers contain hydrated minerals. Location is Memnonia quadrangle.

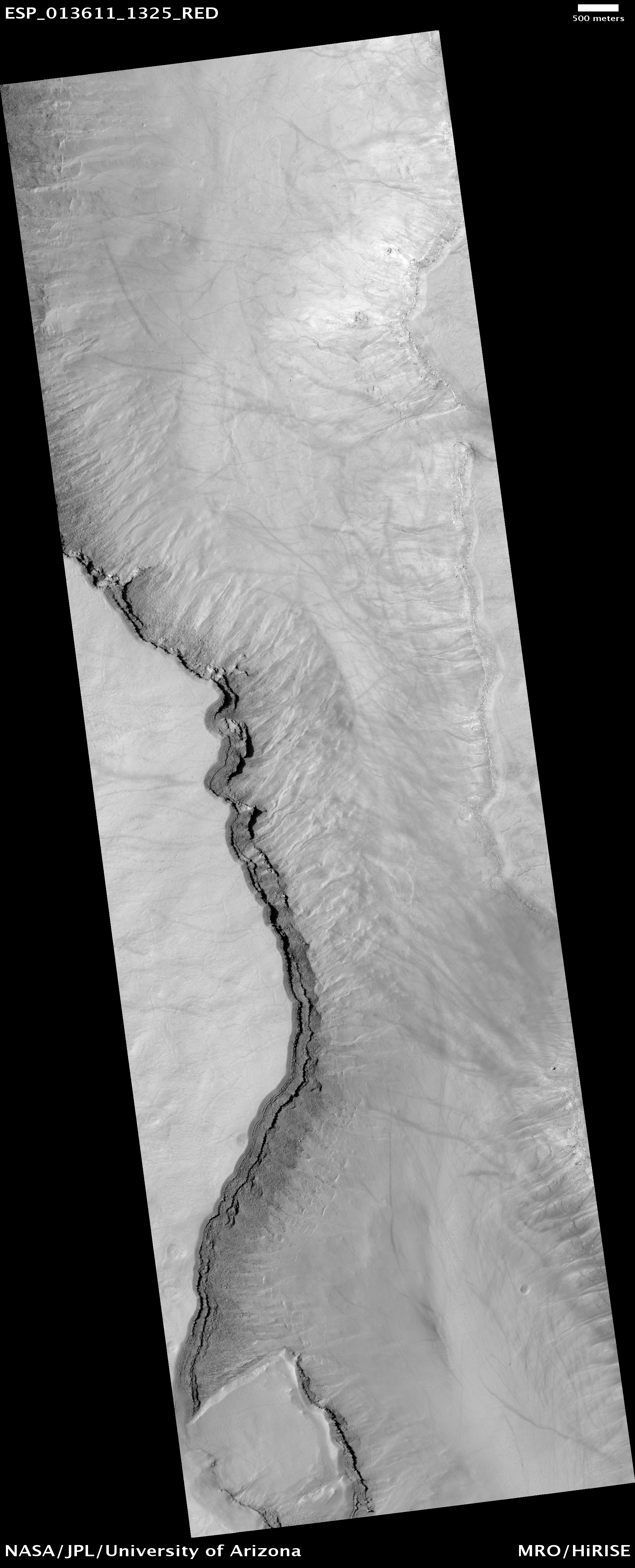
Layers in west slope of Asimov Crater. Location is Noachis quadrangle.

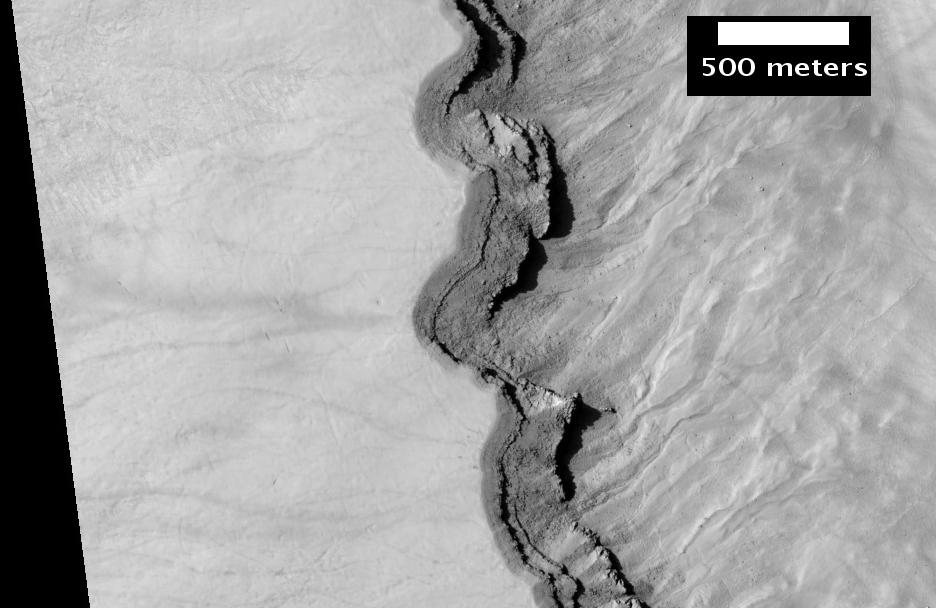
Close-up of layers in west slope of Asimov Crater. Shadows show the overhang. Some of the layers are much more resistant to erosion, so they stick out. Location is Noachis quadrangle.

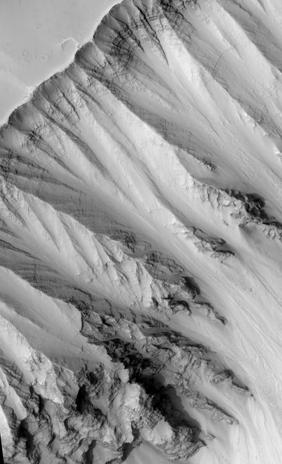
Ophir Chasma Wall. Location is Coprates quadrangle.

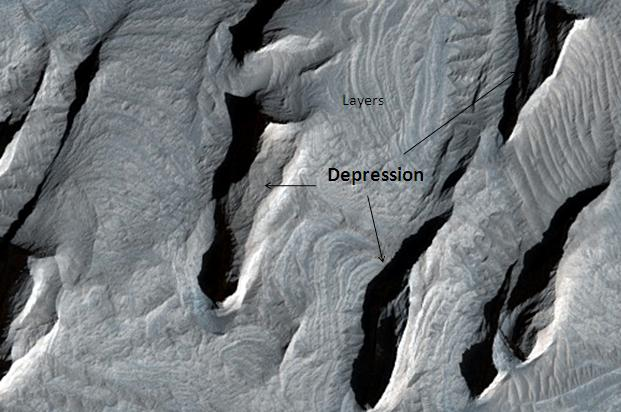
Tithonium Chasma. Location is Coprates quadrangle.

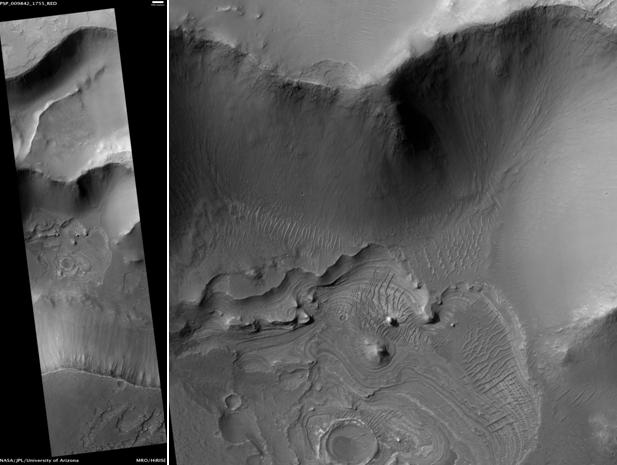
Layers west of Juventae Chasma. Scale bar is 500 meters long. Location is Coprates quadrangle.

Much of the surface of Mars is covered by a thick, smooth mantle that is thought to be a mixture of ice and dust. This ice-rich mantle, a few yards thick, smooths the land. The images below, all taken with HiRISE, show a variety of views of this smooth mantle.

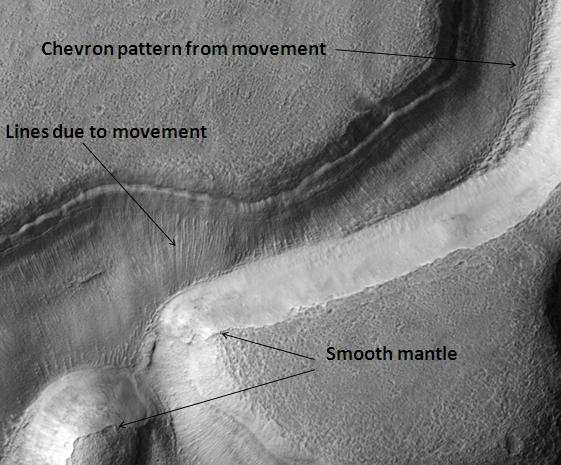
Niger Vallis with features typical of this latitude. Chevron pattern results from movement of ice-rich material. Click on image to see chevron pattern and mantle. Location is Hellas quadrangle.

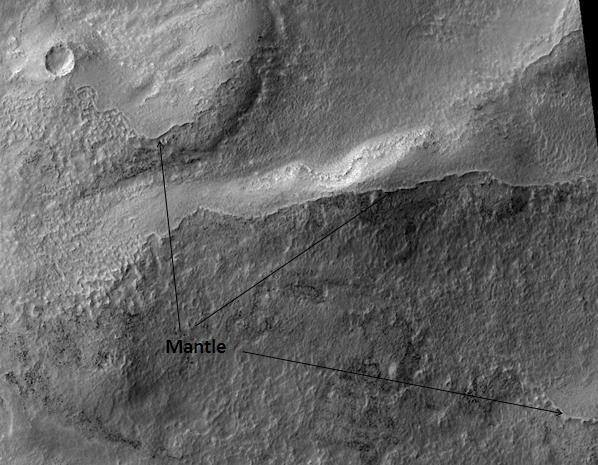
Ptolemaeus Crater Rim. Click on image to see excellent view of mantle deposit. Location is Phaethontis quadrangle.

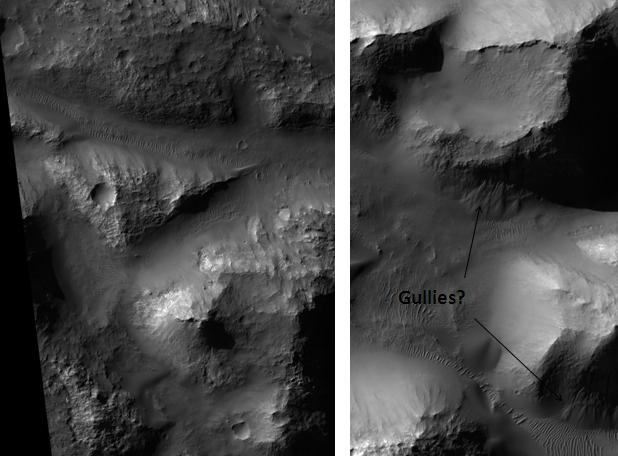
Atlantis Chaos. Click on image to see mantle covering and possible gullies. The two images are different parts of the original image. They have different scales. Location is Phaethontis quadrangle.

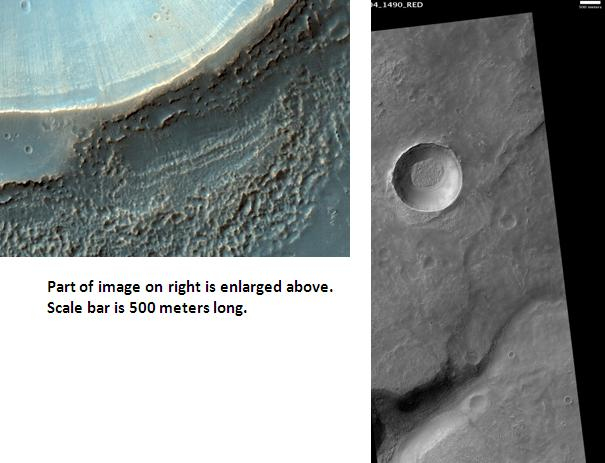
Dissected Mantle with layers. Location is Noachis quadrangle.

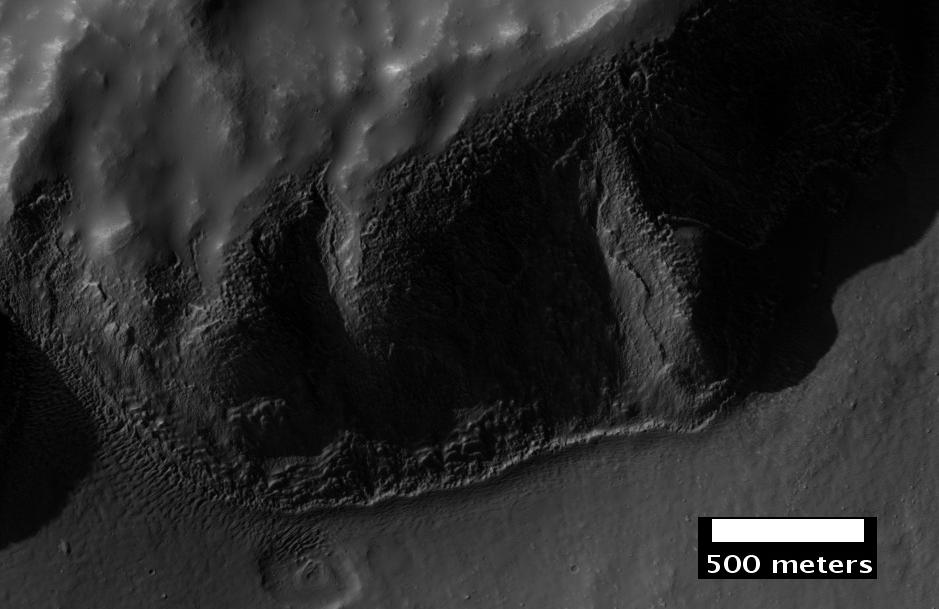
Layers in mantle deposit, as seen by HiRISE, under the HiWish program. Mantle was probably formed from snow and dust falling during a different climate. Location is Thaumasia quadrangle.

Changes in Mars's orbit and tilt cause significant changes in the distribution of water ice from polar regions to latitudes equivalent to Texas. During certain climate periods, water vapor leaves polar ice and enters the atmosphere. The water returns to the ground at lower latitudes as deposits of frost or snow mixed generously with dust. The atmosphere of Mars contains a lot of fine dust particles. Water vapor condenses on the particles, then they fall down to the ground due to the additional weight of the water coating. When ice at the top of the mantling layer goes back into the atmosphere, it leaves behind dust, which insulates the remaining ice.

HiRISE has carried out many observations of gullies that are assumed to have been caused by recent flows of liquid water. Many gullies are imaged multiple times to see if any changes occur. Some repeated observations of gullies have displayed changes that some scientists argue were caused by liquid water over the period of just a few years. Others say the flows were merely dry flows.

Alternate theories for the creation of surface gullies and channels include wind erosion, liquid carbon dioxide, and liquid methane.

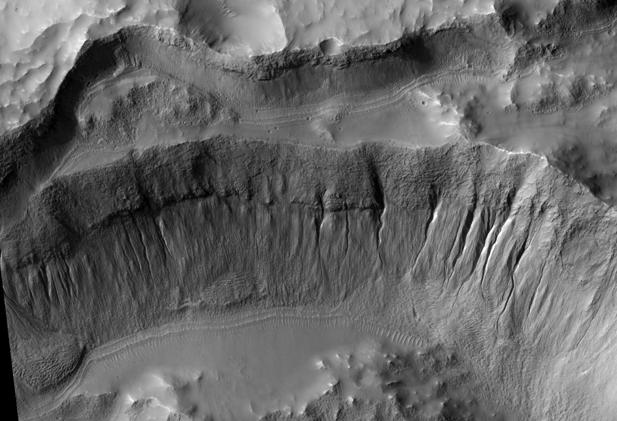
Crater wall inside Mariner Crater showing a large group of gullies.

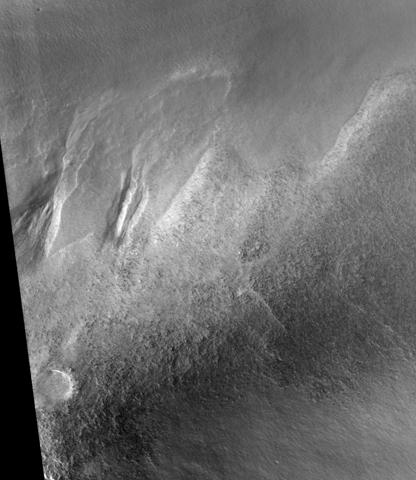
Charitum Montes Gullies. Image located in Argyre quadrangle.

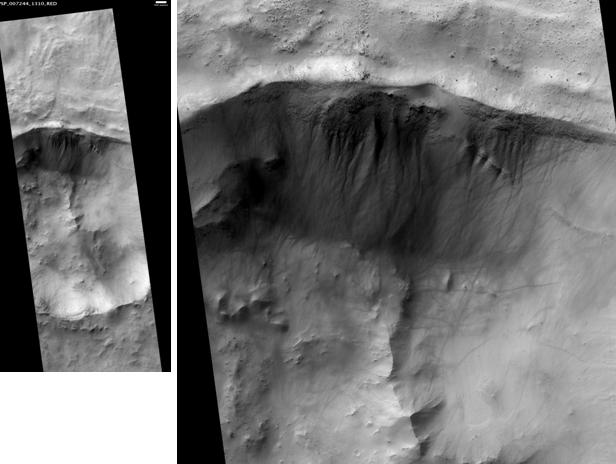
Jezza Crater, as seen by HiRISE. North wall (at top) has gullies. Dark lines are dust devil tracks. Scale bar is 500 meters long. Image located in Argyre quadrangle.

Lohse Crater Gullies on Central Peak. Image located in Argyre quadrangle.

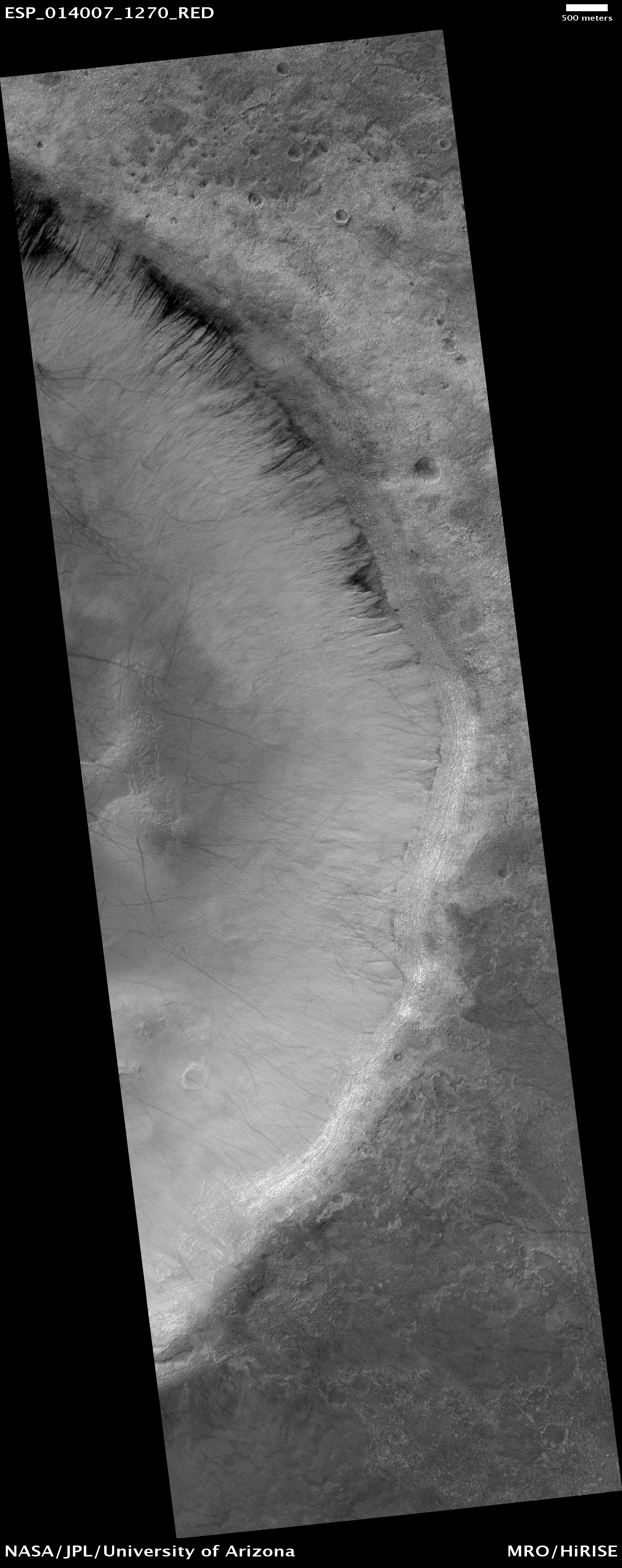
Gullies in Green Crater.

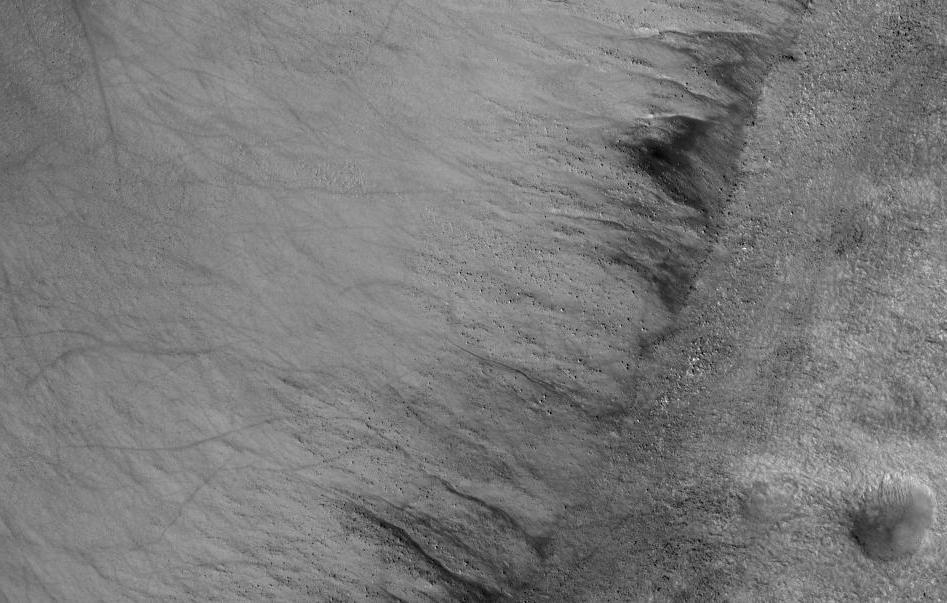
Close-up of gullies in Green Crater. Image located in Argyre quadrangle.

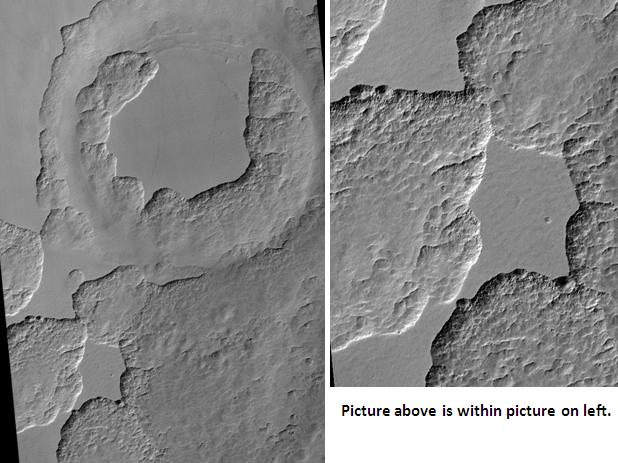
Scalloped Terrain at Peneus Patera. Scalloped terrain is quite common in some areas of Mars.

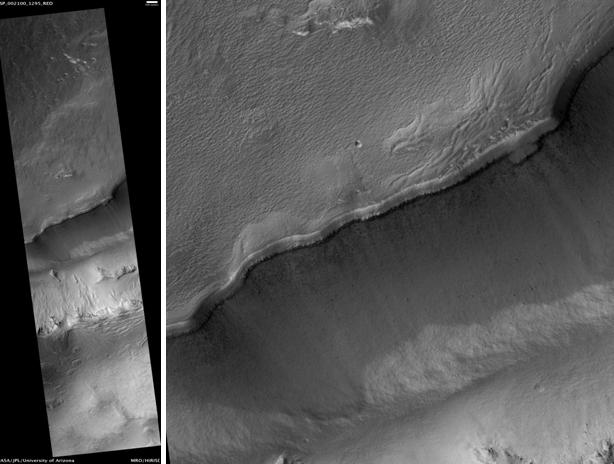
Maunder Crater. The overhang is part of the degraded south (toward bottom) wall of crater. The scale bar is 500 meters long.

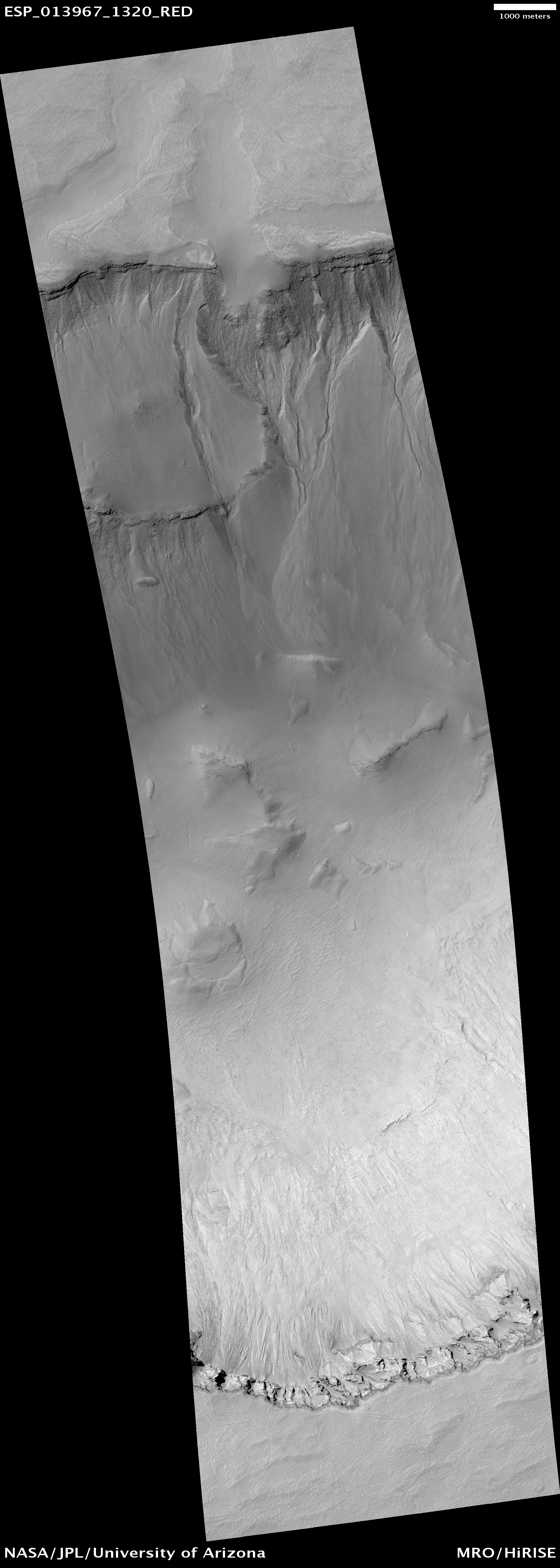
Asimov Crater. Bottom of picture shows southeastern wall of crater. Top of picture is edge of mound that fills most of the crater.

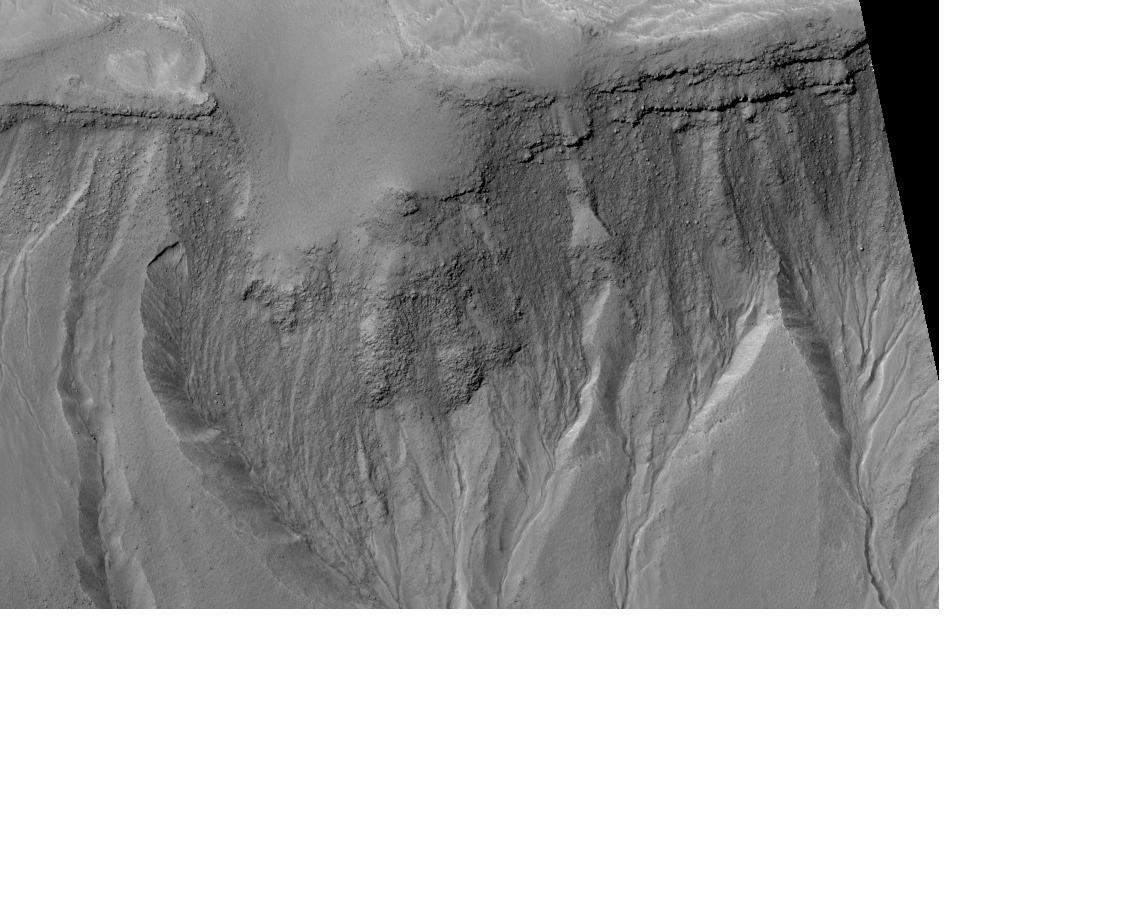
Gullies on mound in Asimov Crater. Location is Noachis quadrangle.

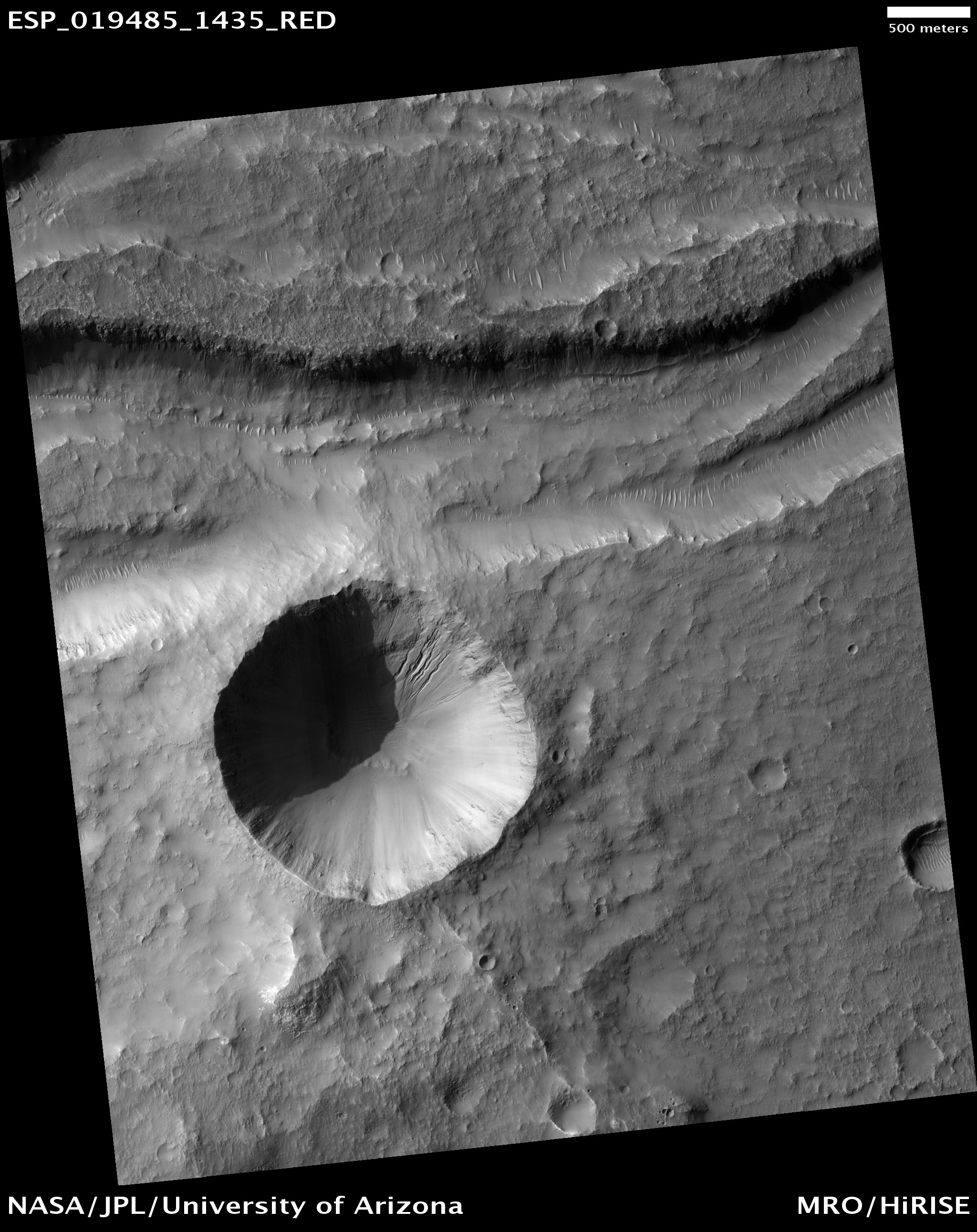
Gullies in a trough and nearby crater, as seen by HiRISE under the HiWish program. Scale bar is 500 meters long. Location is Phaethontis quadrangle.

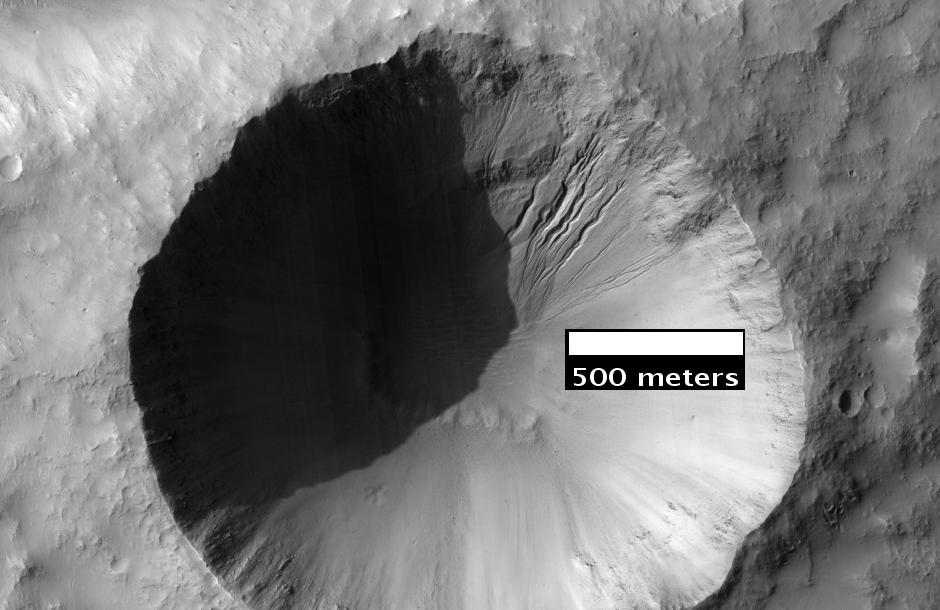
Close-up of gullies in crater, as seen by HiRISE under the HiWish program. Location is Phaethontis quadrangle.

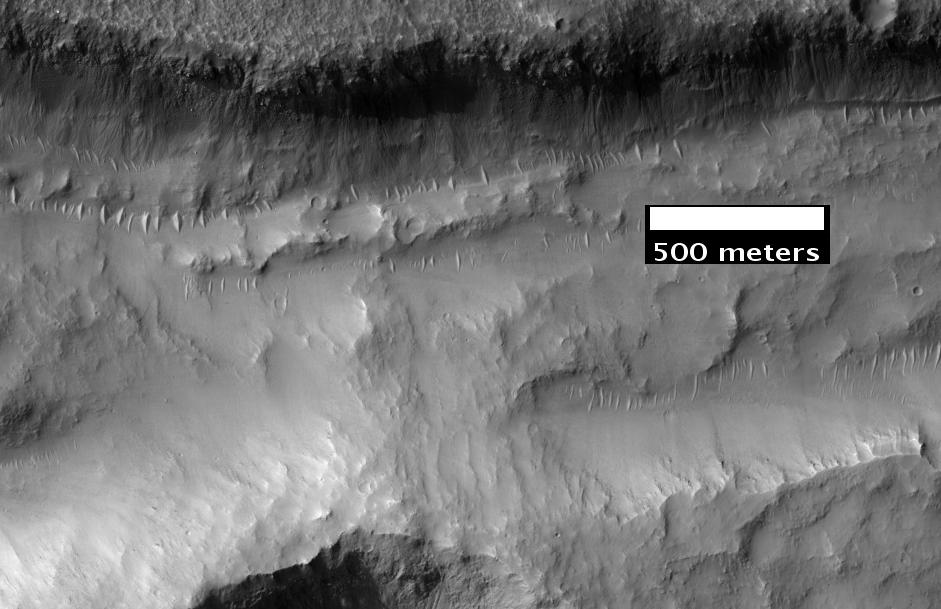
Close-up of gullies in trough, as seen by HiRISE under the HiWish program. These are some of the smaller gullies visible on Mars. Location is Phaethontis quadrangle.

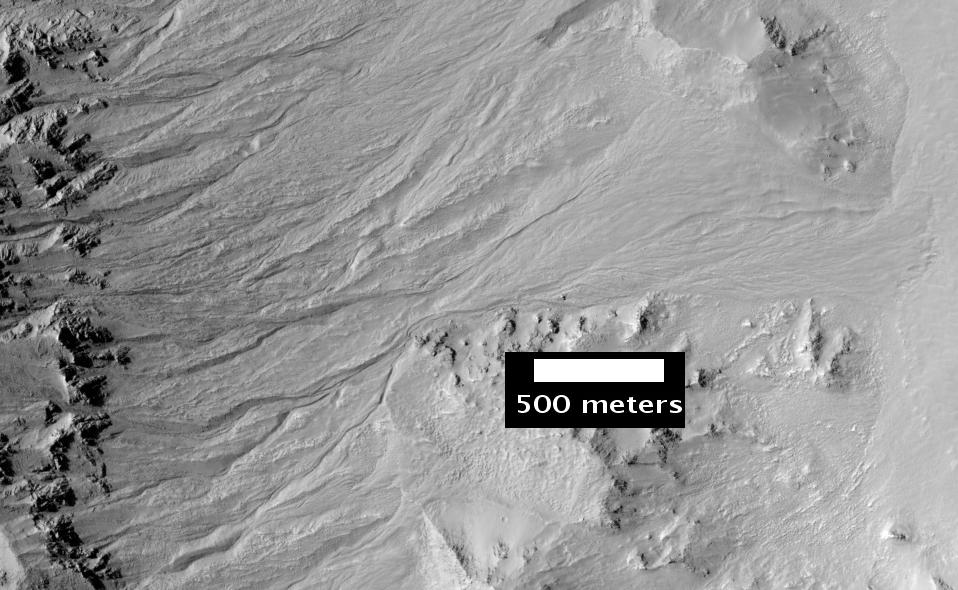
Gullies in Phaethontis quadrangle. Notice how channels curve around obstacles.

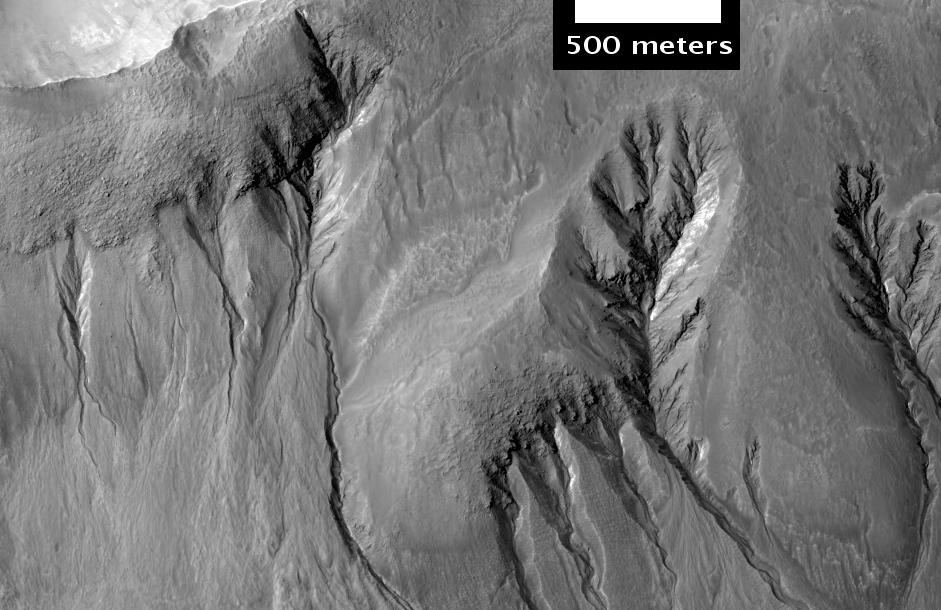
Gullies with branches in Phaethontis quadrangle.

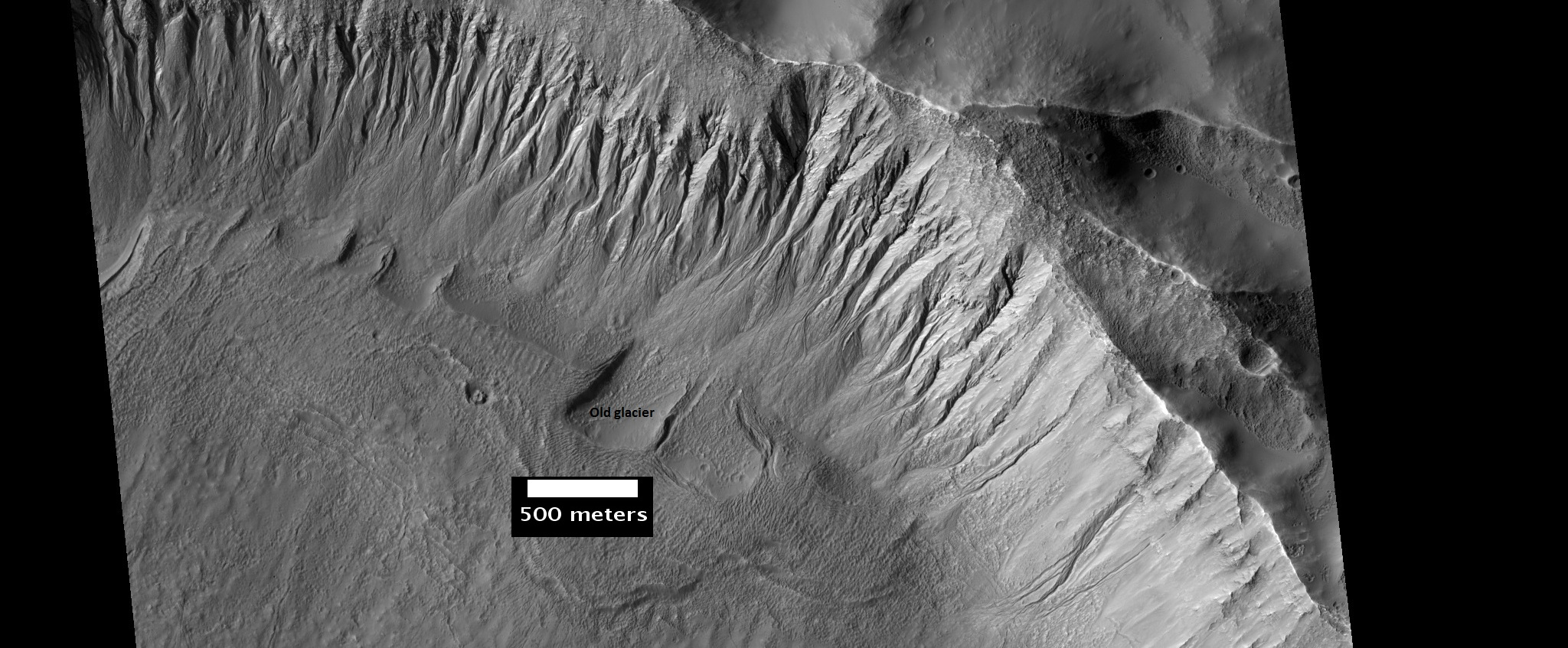
Gullies near Newton Crater, as seen by HiRISE, under the HiWish program. Place where there was an old glacier is labeled. Image from Phaethontis quadrangle.

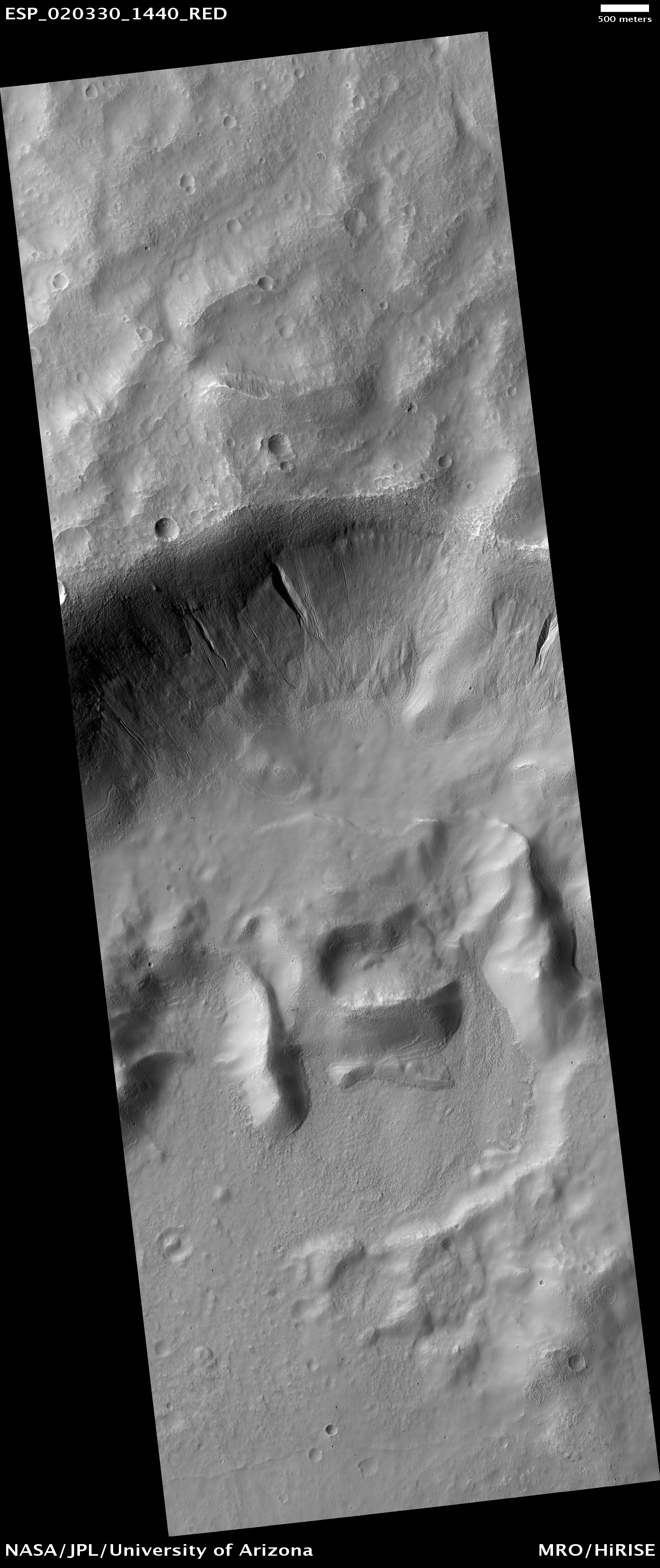
HiRISE image showing gullies. The scale bar is 500 meters. Picture taken under the HiWish program. Image from the Eridania quadrangle.

Of interest from the days of the Viking orbiters are piles of material surrounding cliffs. These deposits of rock debris are called lobate debris aprons (LDAs). These features have a convex topography and a gentle slope from cliffs or escarpments, suggesting flow away from the steep source cliff. In addition, lobate debris aprons can show surface lineations just as rock glaciers on Earth. Recently, research with the Shallow Radar on the Mars Reconnaissance Orbiter has provided strong evidence that the LDAs in Hellas Planitia and in mid-northern latitudes are glaciers covered with a thin layer of rocks. Radar from the Mars Reconnaissance Orbiter gave a strong reflection from the top and base of LDAs, meaning that pure water ice made up the bulk of the formation (between the two reflections). Based on the experiments of the Phoenix lander and the studies of the Mars Odyssey from orbit, frozen water is now known to exist at just under the surface of Mars in the far north and south (high latitudes). The discovery of water ice in LDAs demonstrates that water is found at even lower latitudes. Lobate debris aprons are shown below from the Phlegra Montes, which are at a latitude of 38.2 degrees north.

Below are examples of lobate debris aprons that were studied with HiRISE.

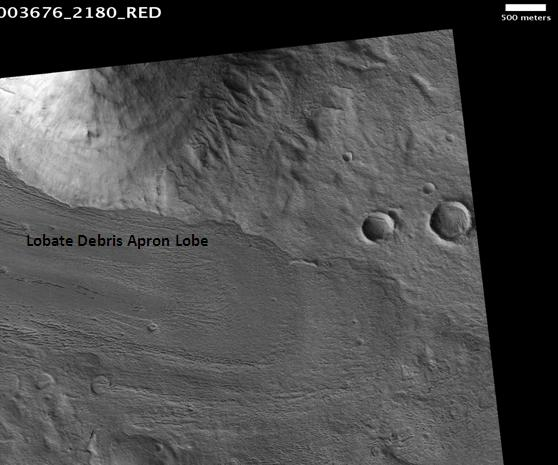
Lobate debris apron in Phlegra Montes, Cebrenia quadrangle. The debris apron is probably mostly ice with a thin covering of rock debris, so it could be a source of water for future Martian colonists. Scale bar is 500 meters long.

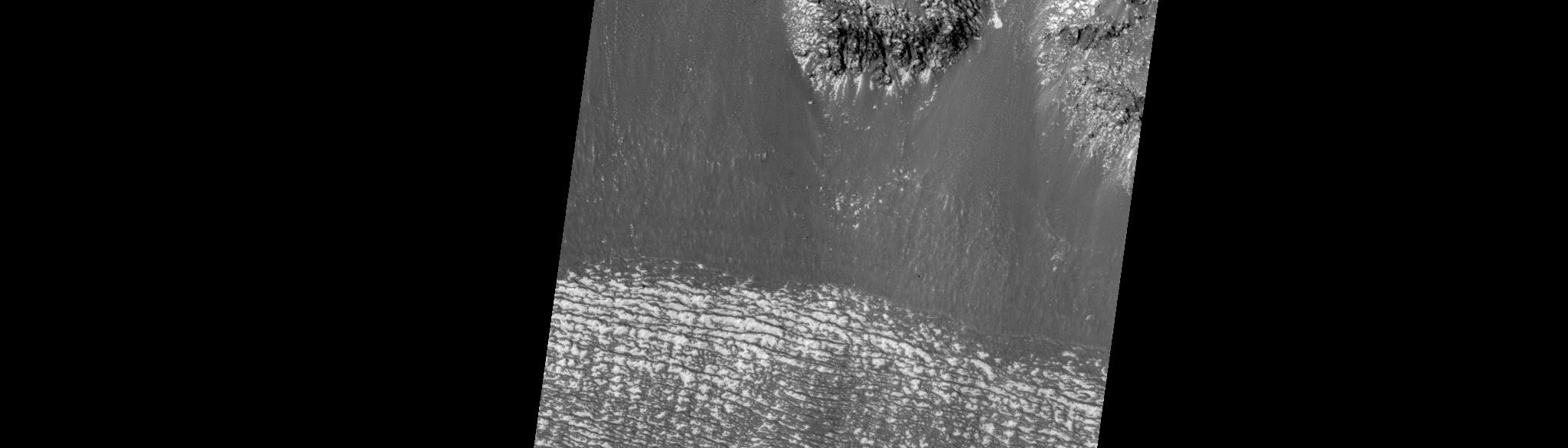
Close-up of surface of a lobate debris apron. Note the lines that are common in rock glaciers on the Earth. Image located in Hellas quadrangle.

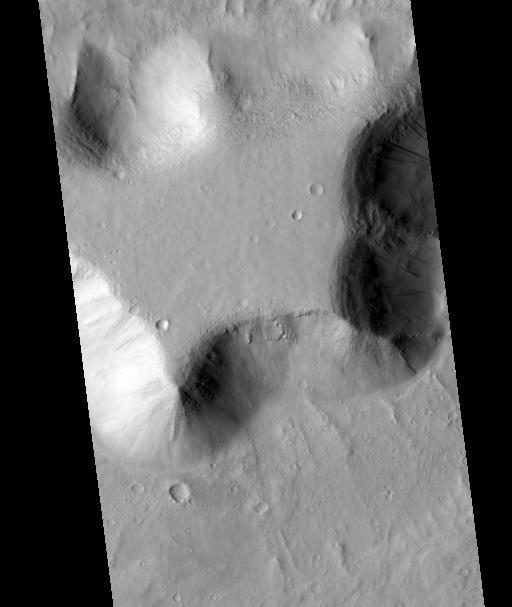
View of lobate debris apron along a slope. Image located in Arcadia quadrangle.

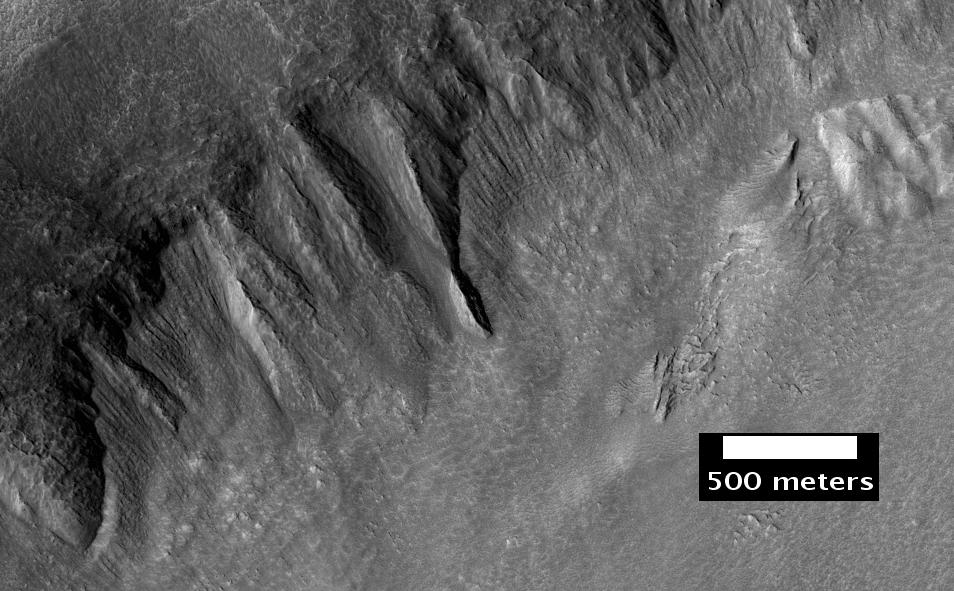
Place where a lobate debris apron begins. Note stripes which indicate movement. Image located in Ismenius Lacus quadrangle.

Some new craters on Mars show exposed pure water ice. After a time, the ice disappears, evaporating into the atmosphere. The ice is only a few feet deep. The ice was confirmed with the Compact Imaging Spectrometer (CRISM) on board the MRO. The ice was found in five locations. Three of the locations are in the Cebrenia quadrangle. These locations are 55.57° N, 150.62° E; 43.28° N, 176.9° E; and 45° N, 164.5° E. Two others are in the Diacria quadrangle: 46.7° N, 176.8° E and 46.33° N, 176.9° E.

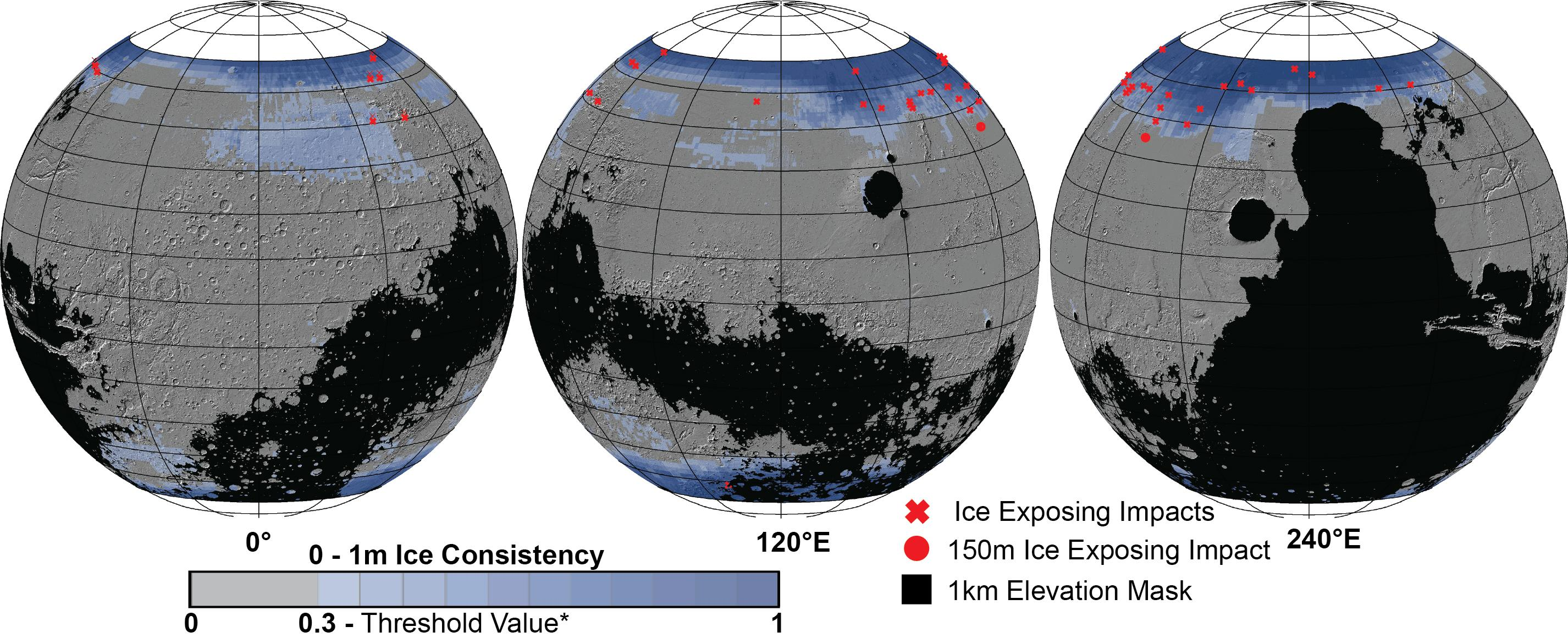
Maps of buried ice on Mars (26 October 2023)

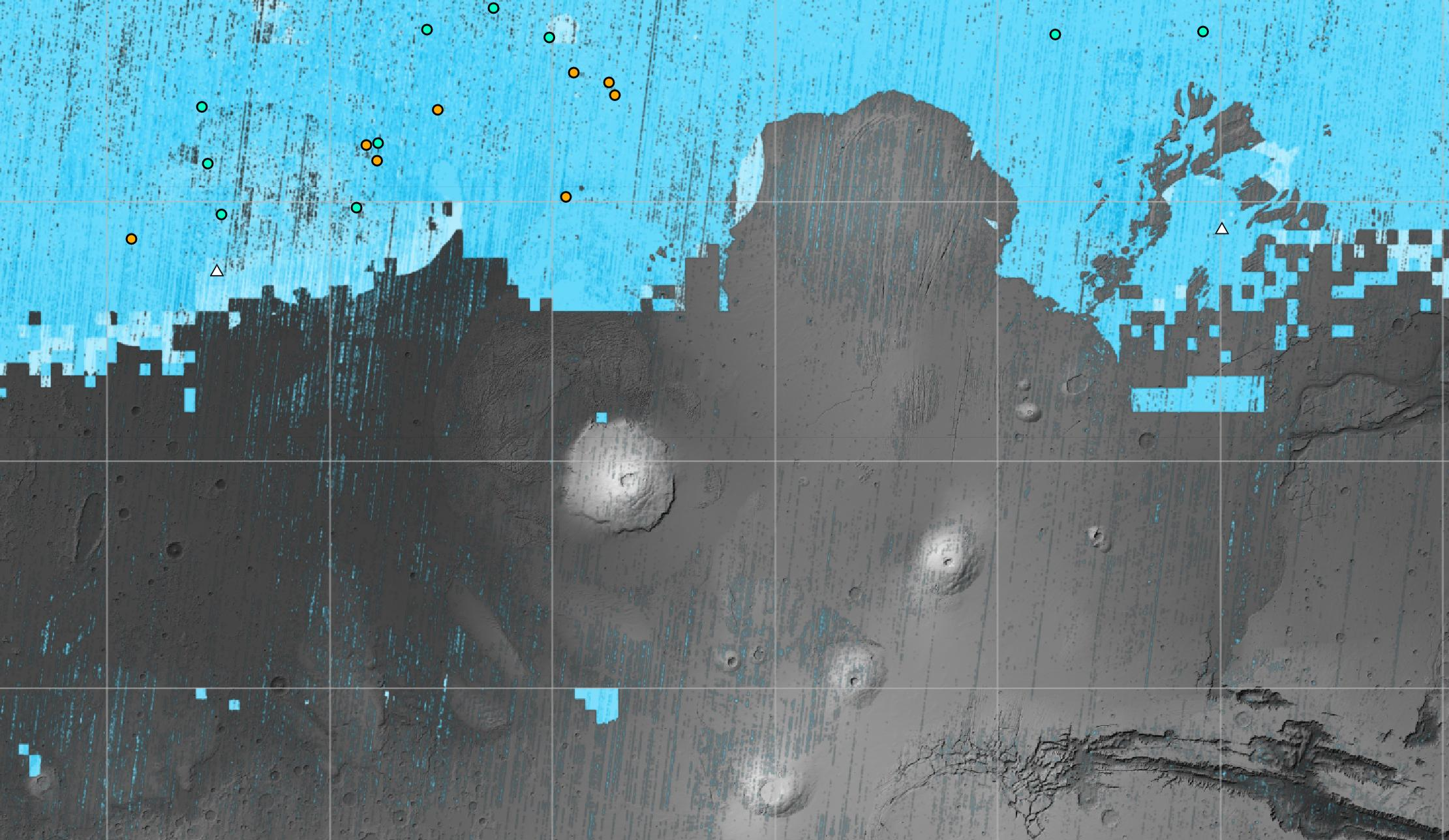
Map of subsurface water ice on Mars (26 October 2023)

== InSight ==
InSight's objectives were to place a seismometer, called Seismic Experiment for Interior Structure (SEIS), on the surface of Mars to measure seismic activity and provide accurate 3D models of the planet's interior; and measure internal heat transfer using a heat probe called HP^{3} to study Mars's early geological evolution. InSight successfully landed on Mars on 26 November 2018. Due to excessive dust on its solar panels preventing it from recharging, NASA put InSight in low-power mode for detecting seismic events in July 2022 and continued monitoring the lander through the operational period ending in December 2022. In August 2024, it was reported that a reservoir of liquid water had been discovered on Mars at a depth of 11.5 to 20 kilometres (7.1 to 12.4 mi), based on seismometer measurements.

== ExoMars Trace Gas Orbiter ==
The ESA–Roscosmos Trace Gas Orbiter (TGO), which began its science mission in April 2018, carries instruments that probe both the atmosphere and the shallow subsurface for water. Its Fine-Resolution Epithermal Neutron Detector (FREND) neutron telescope maps hydrogen content in the uppermost metre of Martian soil by detecting neutrons produced by cosmic ray impacts, as wetter soil emits fewer neutrons. In 2021, FREND data revealed a large area in Candor Chaos, within Valles Marineris, where up to 40% of the near-surface material appears to be water, either as ice or hydrated minerals — the largest concentration of water detected this close to the equator. TGO's atmospheric spectrometers, NOMAD and ACS, have simultaneously tracked how water vapour rises through the atmosphere with the seasons, complementing MAVEN's measurements of hydrogen escape from above.

== Perseverance ==
NASA Perseverance rover found that instead of all the rocks in Jezero crater being sedimentary, being "transported into the crater by wind or water", "several types of igneous rock" were discovered, which "showed evidence of interaction with water". Additionally,

At a rock named "Wildcat Ridge" located within Jezero's well-preserved sedimentary fan deposit, Perseverance found evidence for an ancient lake environment. Not only were these sediments likely deposited in a standing body of water, but they also continued to interact with water long after they were formed. The environments recorded within the rocks at Wildcat Ridge would have been habitable for ancient microbial life, and this type of rock is ideal for preserving possible signs of ancient life.

They also found that "sediments entering Jezero's lake were deposited in a delta" and "evidence for late-stage, high-energy flooding that carried large boulders into the crater". PIXL found that "the crater floor experienced a period of erosion before the deposition of the overlying delta strata. The regularity and horizontality of the basal delta sediments observed in the radar cross sections indicate that they were deposited in a low-energy lake environment."

== Zhurong ==
China's Zhurong rover, part of the Tianwen-1 mission, landed in southern Utopia Planitia on 14 May 2021 — the first successful Chinese Mars surface mission. Using its short-wave infrared spectrometer, Zhurong identified hydrated sulfate and silica minerals in bright-toned rocks at the landing site. These rocks form a layer of duricrust substantially thicker than crusts formed by atmospheric water vapour alone, suggesting they were cemented by significant liquid water from either rising groundwater or the melting of subsurface ice. Because the terrain at the landing site dates to the Amazonian epoch, the most recent and supposedly driest period of Martian history, the finding indicates that the planet's surface water cycle was more active in relatively recent geological time than previously assumed. Zhurong's ground-penetrating radar has additionally revealed layered subsurface structures consistent with sedimentary deposition, prompting further investigation into whether the region once hosted a shallow body of water.

== See also ==
- Atmosphere of Mars § Water vapor
- Climate of Mars
- Colonization of Mars
- Evolution of water on Mars and Earth
- Extraterrestrial life
- Extraterrestrial liquid water
- Geology of Mars § Hydrology
- Life on Mars (planet)#Liquid water
- Mars Ocean Hypothesis
- Seasonal flows on warm Martian slopes
