= Becquerel (disambiguation) =

The becquerel (symbol: Bq) is the SI derived unit of radioactivity, named after Henri Becquerel.

Becquerel may also refer to:

== People ==
- Becquerel family, a family of French scientists
  - Antoine César Becquerel (1788–1878)
  - Alexandre-Edmond Becquerel (1820-1891)
  - Henri Becquerel (1852-1908), Nobel laureate and namesake of the term becquerel
  - Jean Becquerel (1878-1953)
  - Louis Alfred Becquerel (1814-1862)

== Places ==
- 6914 Becquerel, asteroid
- Becquerel (lunar crater)
- Becquerel (Martian crater)

== Other uses ==
- Becquerel, a dog in the web comic Homestuck
- Becquerel effect, alternative name for the photo-voltaic effect
- Becquerel Prize, prize for contributions to photovoltaic research
- Becquerel Rays, the original name given to radioactivity
- Becquerelite, a uranium mineral
