= Becquerel family =

Family of Frnech scientists

The Becquerel family is a family of French scientists.

The most notable members include:

- Antoine César Becquerel (1788–1878), pioneer in the study of electric and luminescent phenomena, father of Edmond
  - Louis Alfred Becquerel (1814-1862), French physician and medical researcher, son of Antoine Cesar, brother of Edmond
  - Alexandre-Edmond Becquerel (known as Edmond, 1820-1891), studied the solar spectrum, magnetism, electricity, and optics. Discovered photovoltaic effect. Son of Antoine Cesar, father of Henri.
    - Henri Becquerel (1852-1908), discoverer of radioactivity, son of Edmond, father of Jean
      - Jean Becquerel (1878-1953), worked on the optical and magnetic properties of crystals, son of Henri

== See also ==
- Becquerel (disambiguation)
