= Oxia Palus quadrangle =

Map of Mars

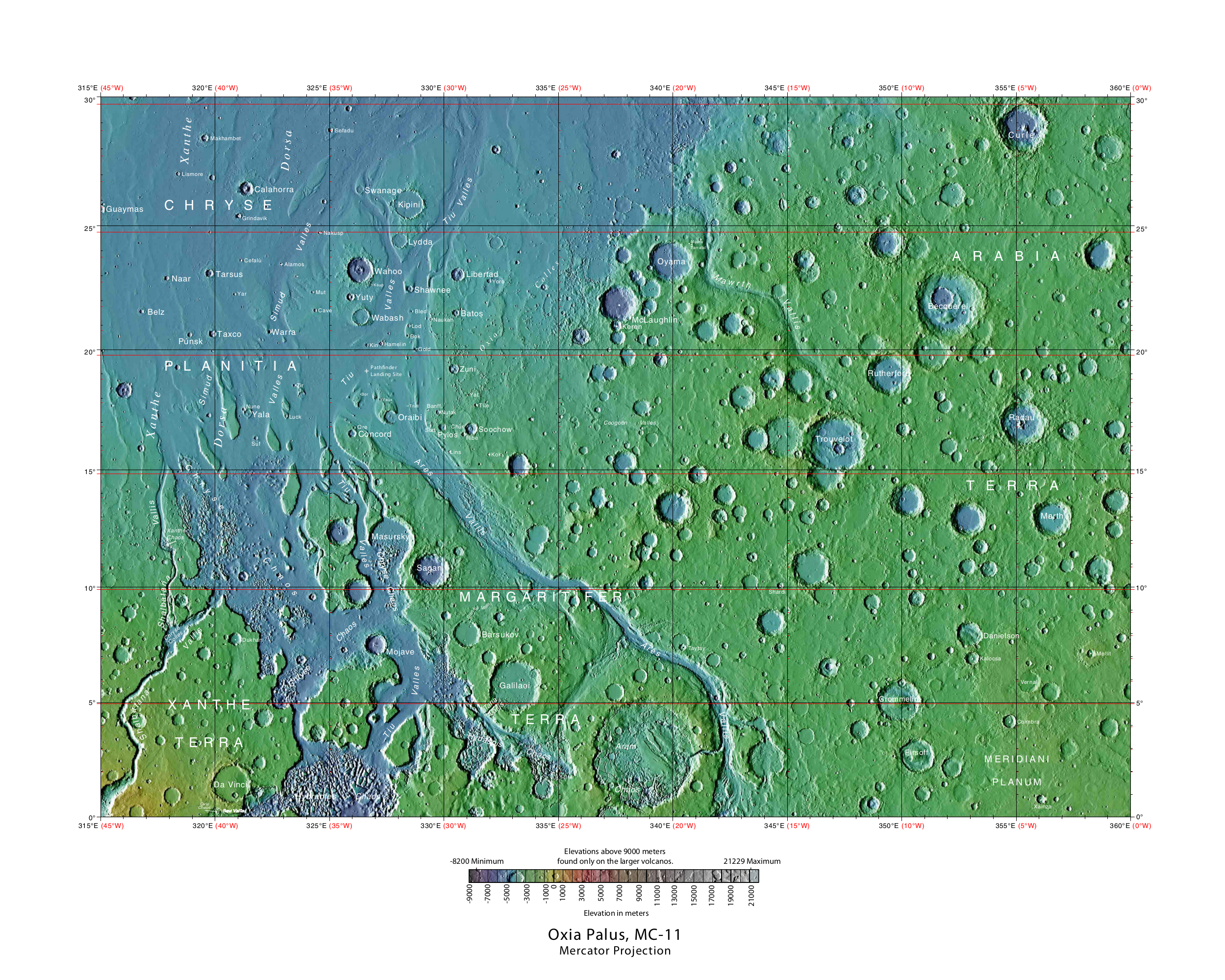
- Map of Oxia Palus quadrangle from Mars Orbiter Laser Altimeter (MOLA) data. The highest elevations are red and the lowest are blue.
- Coordinates: 15°N 22.5°W

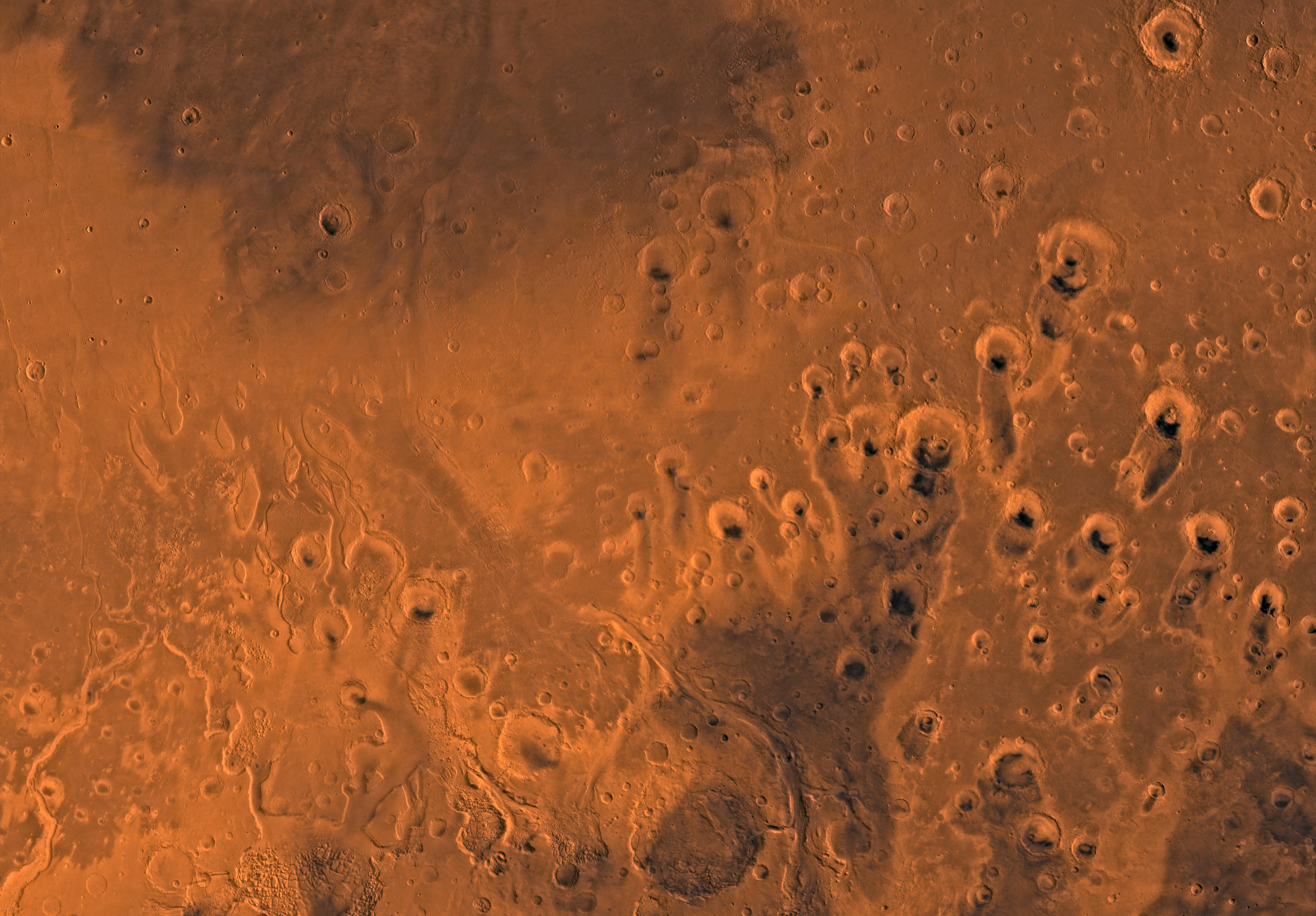
Image of the Oxia Palus Quadrangle (MC-11). The region contains heavily cratered highlands in the southeast which are intersected by several large outflow channels terminating in the relatively smooth plains of Chryse basin in the northwest.

The Oxia Palus quadrangle is one of a series of 30 quadrangle maps of Mars used by the United States Geological Survey (USGS) Astrogeology Research Program. The Oxia Palus quadrangle is also referred to as MC-11 (Mars Chart-11).

The quadrangle covers the region of 0° to 45° west longitude and 0° to 30° north latitude on Mars. This quadrangle contains parts of multiple regions: Chryse Planitia, Arabia Terra, Xanthe Terra, Margaritifer Terra, Meridiani Planum and Oxia Planum.

Mars Pathfinder landed in the Oxia Palus quadrangle at 19.13°N 33.22°W, on July 4, 1997, at the intersection Tiu Valles and Ares Vallis.

Many craters within Oxia Palus are named after famous scientists. Besides Galilei and da Vinci, some of the people who discovered the atom and radiation are honored there: Curie, Becquerel, and Rutherford.

Mawrth Vallis was strongly considered as a landing site for NASA's Curiosity rover, the Mars Science Laboratory. It made it to at least the top two sites for NASA's EXoMars 2020 Rover mission. The exact location proposed for this landing is 22.16 N and 342.05 E.

The Mawrth Vallis region is well studied with more than 40 papers published in peer-reviewed publications. Near the Mawrth channel is a 200 meter high plateau with a number of exposed layers. Spectral studies have detected clay minerals that present as a sequence of layers. Clay minerals were probably deposited in the Early to Middle Noachian period. Later weathering exposed a variety of minerals such as kaolin, alunite, and jarosite. Later, volcanic material covered the region. This volcanic material would have protected any possible organic materials from radiation.

Another site in the Oxia Palus quadrangle has been picked for the EXoMars 2020 landing is at 18.14 N and 335.76 E. This site is of interest because of a long-duration aqueous system including a delta, possible biosignatures, and a variety of clays.

This quadrangle contains abundant evidence for past water in such forms as river valleys, lakes, springs, and chaos areas where water flowed out of the ground. A variety of clay minerals have been found in Oxia Palus. Clay is formed in water, and it is good for preserving microscopic evidence of ancient life. Recently, scientists have found strong evidence for a lake located in the Oxia Palus quadrangle that received drainage from Shalbatana Vallis. The study, carried out with HiRISE images, indicates that water formed a 30-mile-long canyon that opened up into a valley, deposited sediment, and created a delta. This delta and others around the basin imply the existence of a large, long-lived lake. Of special interest is evidence that the lake formed after the warm, wet period was thought to have ended. So, lakes may have been around much longer than previously thought. In October 2015, Oxia Planum, a plain located near 18.275°N 335.368°E, was reported to be the preferred landing location for the ExoMars rover. An erosion-resistant layer on top of clay units may have preserved evidence of life.

== Surface appearance ==
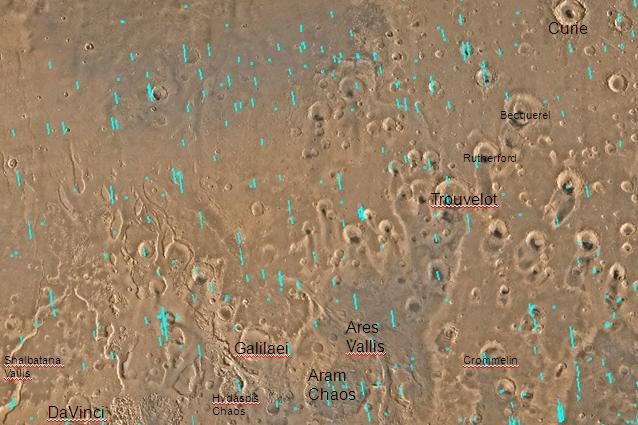
Map of Oxia Palus labeled with major features

The Mars Pathfinder found its landing site to contain a great deal of rocks. Analysis shows the area to have a greater density of rocks than 90% of Mars. Some of the rocks leaned against each other in a manner geologists term imbricated. It is believed strong flood waters in the past pushed the rocks around to face away from the flow. Some pebbles were rounded, perhaps from being tumbled in a stream. Some rocks have holes on their surfaces that seem to have been fluted by wind action. Small sand dunes are present. Parts of the ground are crusty, maybe due to cementing by a fluid containing minerals. In general the rocks show a dark gray color with patches of red dust or weathered appearance on their surfaces. Dust covers the lower 5–7 cm of some rocks, so they may have once been buried, but have now become exhumed. Three knobs, one large crater, and two small craters were visible on the horizon.

== Types of rocks ==
Results of Mars Pathfinder's Alpha Proton X-ray Spectrometer indicated that some rocks in the Oxia Palus quadrangle are like Earth's andesites. The discovery of andesites shows that some Martian rocks have been remelted and reprocessed. On Earth, Andesite forms when magma sits in pockets of rock while some of the iron and magnesium settle out. Consequently, the final rock contains less iron and magnesium and more silica. Volcanic rocks are usually classified by comparing the relative amount of alkalis (Na_{2}O and K_{2}O) with the amount of silica (SiO_{2}). Andesite is different from the rocks found in meteorites that have come from Mars.

By the time that final results of the mission were described in a series of articles in the journal Science (December 5, 1997), it was believed that the rock Yogi contained a coating of dust, but was similar to the rock Barnacle Bill. Calculations suggest that the two rocks contain mostly the minerals orthopyroxene (magnesium-iron silicate), feldspars (aluminum silicates of potassium, sodium, and calcium), quartz (silicon dioxide), with smaller amounts of magnetite, ilmenite, iron sulfide, and calcium phosphate.

== Other results from Pathfinder ==
By taking multiple images of the sky at different distances from the sun, scientists were able to determine that size of the particles in the pink haze was about 1 micrometer in radius. The color of some soils was similar to that of an iron oxyhydroxide phase which would support a warmer and wetter climate in the past. Pathfinder carried a series of magnets to examine the magnetic component of the dust. Eventually, all but one of the magnets developed a coating of dust. Since the weakest magnet did not attract any soil, it was concluded that the airborne dust did not contain pure magnetite or one type of maghemite. The dust probably was an aggregate possible cemented with ferric oxide (Fe_{2}O_{3}).

Winds were usually less than 10 m/s. Dust devils were detected in the early afternoon. The sky had a pink color. There was evidence of clouds and maybe fog.

== River valleys and chaos ==
Many large, ancient river valleys are found in this area; along with collapsed features, called Chaos. The Chaotic features may have collapsed when water came out onto the surface. Martian rivers begin with a Chaos region. A chaotic region can be recognized by a rat's nest of mesas, buttes, and hills, chopped through with valleys which in places look almost patterned. Some parts of this chaotic area have not collapsed completely—they are still formed into large mesas, so they may still contain water ice. Chaotic terrain occurs in multiple locations on Mars, and always gives the strong impression that something abruptly disturbed the ground. More information and more examples of chaos can be found at Chaos terrain. Chaos regions formed long ago. By counting craters (more craters in any given area means an older surface) and by studying the valleys' relations with other geological features, scientists have concluded the channels formed 2.0 to 3.8 billion years ago.

One generally accepted view for the formation of large outflow channels is that they were formed by catastrophic floods of water released from giant groundwater reservoirs. Perhaps, the water started to come out of the ground due to faulting or volcanic activity. Sometimes hot magma just travels under the surface. If that is the case, the ground will be heated, but there may be no evidence of lava at the surface. After water escapes, the surface collapses. Moving across the surface, the water would have simultaneously frozen and evaporated. Chunks of ice that would have rapidly formed may have enhanced the erosive power of the flood. Furthermore, the water may have frozen over at the surface, but continuing to flow underneath, eroding the ground as it moved along. Rivers in cold climates on the Earth often become ice-covered, yet continue to flow.

Such catastrophic floods have occurred on Earth. One commonly cited example is the Channeled Scabland of Washington State; it was formed by the breakout of water from the Pleistocene Lake Missoula. This region resembles the Martian outflow channels.

== Lakes ==
Research, published in January 2010, suggests that Mars had lakes, each around 20 km wide, along parts of the equator, in the Oxia Palus quadrangle. Although earlier research showed that Mars had a warm and wet early history that has long since dried up, these lakes existed in the Hesperian Epoch, which was a much earlier period. Using detailed images from NASA's Mars Reconnaissance Orbiter, the researchers speculate that there may have been increased volcanic activity, meteorite impacts, or shifts in Mars' orbit during this period to warm Mars' atmosphere enough to melt the abundant ice present in the ground. Volcanoes would have released gases that thickened the atmosphere for a temporary period, trapping more sunlight and making it warm enough for liquid water to exist. In this new study, channels were discovered that connected lake basins near Ares Vallis. When one lake filled up, its waters overflowed the banks and carved the channels to a lower area where another lake formed. These lakes would be another place to look for evidence of present or past life.

== Aram Chaos ==
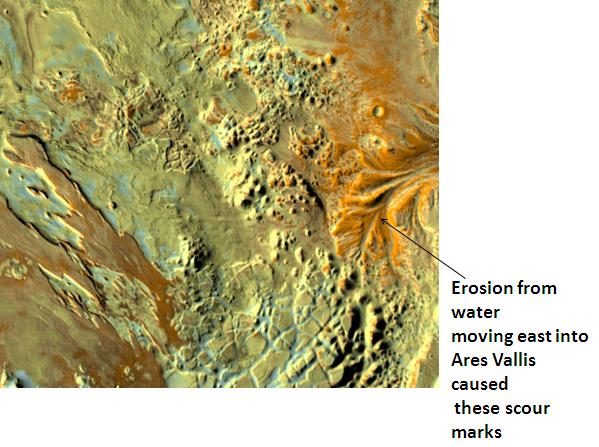
Erosion in Aram Chaos, as seen by THEMIS

Aram Chaos is an ancient impact crater near the Martian equator, close to Ares Vallis. About 280 kilometers (170 mi) across, Aram lies in a region called Margaritifer Terra, where a number of water-carved channels show that floods poured out of the highlands onto the northern lowlands ages ago. The Thermal Emission Imaging System (THEMIS) on the Mars Odyssey orbiter found gray crystalline hematite on the floor of Aram. Hematite is an iron-oxide mineral that can precipitate when ground water circulates through iron-rich rocks, whether at normal temperatures or in hot springs. The floor of Aram contains huge blocks of collapsed, or chaotic, terrain that formed when water or ice was catastrophically removed. Elsewhere on Mars, the release of groundwater produced massive floods that eroded the large channels seen in Ares Vallis and similar outflow valleys. In Aram Chaos, however, the released water stayed mostly within the crater's ramparts, eroding only a small, shallow outlet channel in the eastern wall. Several minerals including hematite, sulfate minerals, and water-altered silicates in Aram suggests that a lake probably once existed within the crater. Because forming hematite requires liquid water, which could not long exist without a thick atmosphere, Mars must have had a much thicker atmosphere at some time in the past, when the hematite was formed.

== Layered sediments ==
Oxia Palus is an interesting area with multiple craters showing layered sediments. Such sediments may have been deposited by water, wind, or volcanoes. The thickness of the layers is different in different craters. In Becquerel some layers are about 4 meters thick. In Crommelin crater the layers average 20 meters in thickness. At times, the top layer may be resistant to erosion and will form a feature called a mensa, the Latin word for table.

The pattern of layers within layers measured in Becquerel crater suggests that each layer was formed over a period of about 100,000 years. Moreover, every 10 layers can be grouped into larger bundles. So every 10-layer pattern took one million years to form (100,000 years/layer × 10 layers). The ten-layer pattern is repeated at least ten times, that is there are least ten bundles, each consisting of ten layers. It is believed that the layers relate to the cycle of changing tilt of Mars.

The tilt of the Earth's axis changes by only a little more than 2 degrees. In contrast, Mars's tilt varies by tens of degrees. Today, the tilt (or obliquity) of Mars is low, so the poles are the coldest places on the planet, while the equator is the warmest. This causes gases in the atmosphere, like water and carbon dioxide, to migrate poleward, where they turn into ice. When the obliquity is higher, the poles receive more sunlight, and those materials migrate away. When carbon dioxide moves from the poles, the atmospheric pressure increases, maybe causing a difference in the ability of winds to transport and deposit sand. With more water in the atmosphere, sand grains deposited on the surface may stick and cement together to form layers. This study was done using stereo topographic maps obtained by processing data from the high-resolution camera onboard NASA's Mars Reconnaissance Orbiter.

A detailed discussion of layering with multiple Martian examples can be found in Sedimentary Geology of Mars.

== Linear ridge networks ==
Linear ridge networks are found in various places on Mars in and around craters. Ridges often appear as mostly straight segments that intersect in a lattice-like manner. They are hundreds of meters long, tens of meters high, and several meters wide. It is thought that impacts created fractures in the surface, these fractures later acted as channels for fluids. Fluids cemented the structures. With the passage of time, surrounding material was eroded away, thereby leaving hard ridges behind. Since the ridges occur in locations with clay, these formations could serve as a marker for clay which requires water for its formation. Water here could have supported past life in these locations. Clay may also preserve fossils or other traces of past life.

== Wrinkle ridges ==
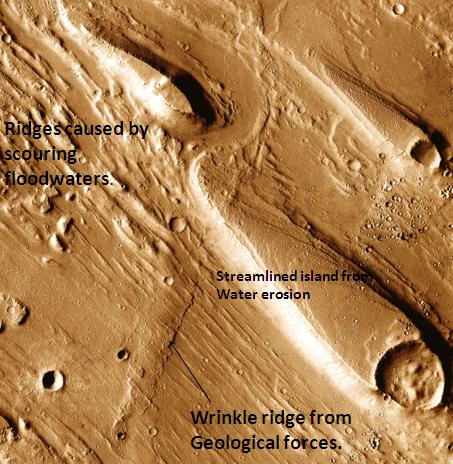
Erosion features in Ares Vallis, as seen by THEMIS

Many areas of Mars show wrinkles on the surface, called wrinkle ridges. They are elongated and are often found on smooth area of Mars. Because they are wide, gentle topographic highs, they are sometimes hard to see. Although first thought to be caused by lava flows, they are now generally thought to be more likely caused by compressional tectonic forces that cause folding and faulting. A wrinkle ridge is visible in the image to the right of Ares Vallis.

== Faults ==
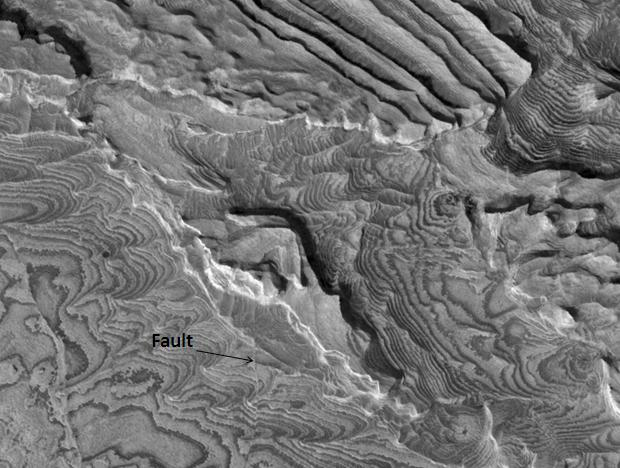
Becquerel (Martian crater) layers, as seen by HiRISE. Click on image to see fault.

A picture below right, taken of layers in Becquerel Crater, shows a straight line that represents a fault. Faults are breaks in rocks where movement has taken place. The movement may be only inches or much more. Faults can be significant, as the break in the rock is a focus for erosion and, more importantly, can allow fluids containing dissolved minerals to rise, then be deposited. Some of the major ore deposits on Earth are formed by this process.

== Springs ==
A study of images taken with the High Resolution Imaging Science Experiment (HiRISE) on the Mars Reconnaissance Orbiter strongly suggests that hot springs once existed in Vernal Crater, in the Oxia Palus quadrangle. These springs may have provided a long-time location for life. Furthermore, mineral deposits associated with these springs may have preserved traces of Martian life. In Vernal Crater on a dark part of the floor, two light-toned, elliptical structures closely resemble hot springs on the Earth. They have inner and outer halos, with roughly circular depressions. A large number of hills are lined up close to the springs. These are thought to have formed by the movement of fluids along the boundaries of dipping beds. A picture below shows these springs. One of the depressions is visible. The discovery of opaline silica by the Mars Rovers, on the surface also suggests the presence of hot springs. Opaline silica is often deposited in hot springs. Scientists proposed this area should be visited by the Mars Science Laboratory.

== Craters ==
=== Mojave crater ===
The crater Mojave, in the Xanthe Terra region, has alluvial fans that look remarkably similar to landforms in the Mojave Desert in the American southwest. As on Earth, the largest rocks are near the mouths of the fans. Because channels start at the tops of ridges, it is believed they were formed by heavy downpours. Researchers have suggested that the rain may have been initiated by impacts.

Mojave is approximately 2,604 meters (1.618 miles) deep. Its depth relative to its diameter and its ray system are indications it is young. Crater counts of its ejecta blanket give an age of about 3 million years. It is considered the most recent crater of its size on Mars, and has been identified as the probable source of the shergottite meteorites collected on Earth.

=== Pedestal crater ===
A pedestal crater is a crater with its ejecta sitting above the surrounding terrain and thereby forming a raised platform (like a pedestal). They form when an impact crater ejects material which forms an erosion-resistant layer, thus causing the immediate area to erode more slowly than the rest of the region. Some pedestals have been accurately measured to be hundreds of meters above the surrounding area. This means that hundreds of meters of material were eroded away. The result is that both the crater and its ejecta blanket stand above the surroundings. Pedestal craters were first observed during the Mariner missions.

=== Other craters ===
Impact craters generally have rims with ejecta around them; in contrast volcanic craters usually do not have a rim or ejecta deposits. As craters get larger (greater than 10 km in diameter) they usually have a central peak. The peak is caused by a rebound of the crater floor following the impact. Sometimes craters display layers. Since the collision that produces a crater is like a powerful explosion, rocks from deep underground are tossed onto the surface. Hence, craters can show what lies deep under the surface.

== Vallis ==
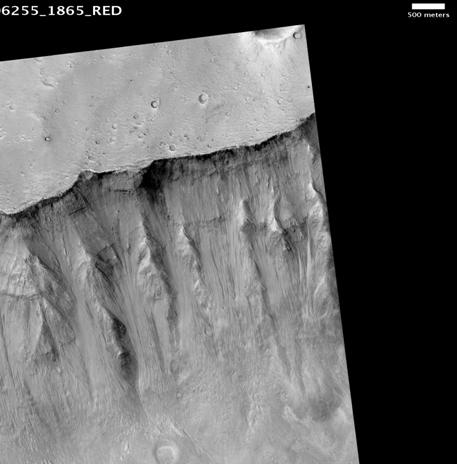
Shalbatana Vallis, as seen by HiRISE. The scale bar is 500 meters long.

Vallis (plural valles) is the Latin word for valley. It is used in planetary geology for the naming of landform features on other planets.

Vallis was used for old river valleys that were discovered on Mars, when probes were first sent to Mars. The Viking Orbiters caused a revolution in our ideas about water on Mars; river valleys were found in multiple areas. Spacecraft cameras showed that floods of water broke through dams, carved deep valleys, eroded grooves into bedrock, and traveled thousands of kilometers.

== See also ==
- Chaos terrain
- Climate of Mars
- Fault (geology)
- Geology of Mars
- Groundwater on Mars
- HiRISE
- Impact crater
- List of quadrangles on Mars
- List of rocks on Mars
- Martian Craters
- McLaughlin crater
- Outflow channels
- Pedestal crater
- The Martian (film)
- Vallis
- Water on Mars
- Wrinkle ridge

MC-01 Mare Boreum (features)
MC-02 Diacria (features)		MC-03 Arcadia (features)	MC-04 Acidalium (features)	MC-05 Ismenius Lacus (features)		MC-06 Casius (features)	MC-07 Cebrenia (features)
MC-08 Amazonis (features)	MC-09 Tharsis (features)	MC-10 Lunae Palus (features)	MC-11 Oxia Palus (features)	MC-12 Arabia (features)	MC-13 Syrtis Major (features)	MC-14 Amenthes (features)	MC-15 Elysium (features)
MC-16 Memnonia (features)	MC-17 Phoenicis Lacus (features)	MC-18 Coprates (features)	MC-19 Margaritifer Sinus (features)	MC-20 Sinus Sabaeus (features)	MC-21 Iapygia (features)	MC-22 Mare Tyrrhenum (features)	MC-23 Aeolis (features)
MC-24 Phaethontis (features)		MC-25 Thaumasia (features)	MC-26 Argyre (features)	MC-27 Noachis (features)		MC-28 Hellas (features)	MC-29 Eridania (features)
MC-30 Mare Australe (features)
