= Louis Alfred Becquerel =

French physician and medical researcher

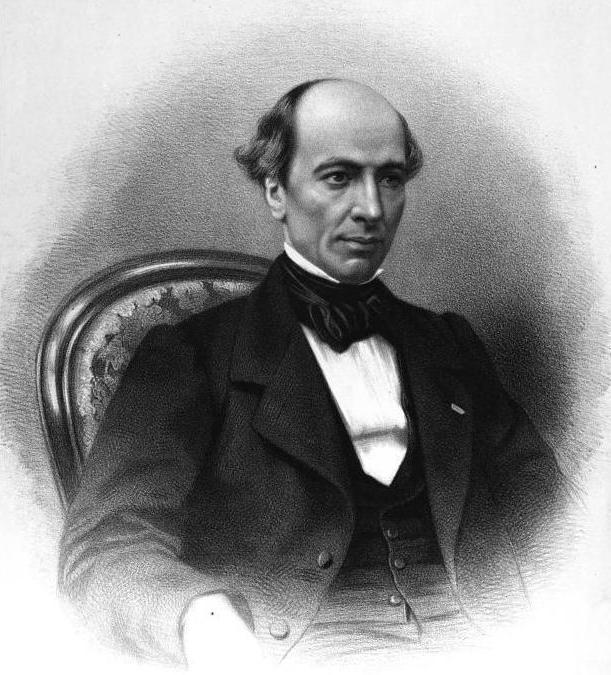
Louis Alfred Becquerel

Louis Alfred Becquerel (3 June 1814 – 10 March 1862) was a French medical doctor and medical researcher.

Becquerel was born in Paris. He was the oldest son of Antoine César Becquerel, and brother of Alexandre Edmond Becquerel. In 1840 he obtained his doctorate with the thesis "Recherches cliniques sur les affections tuberculeuses du cerveau", and in 1847 attained the title of professeur agrégé.

Becquerel died in Paris.

== Biography ==
The eldest son of Antoine César Becquerel, he began his career as a physician at La Pitié. Named Officer of the Legion of Honor in 1845, Becquerel collaborated with Maxime Vernois on two books in 1853 and 1856. He is the brother of Edmond Becquerel.

== Selected works ==
- Recherches cliniques sur la méningite des enfants, 1838.
- Recherches cliniques sur les affections tuberculeuses du cerveau, 1840.
- Traité du bégayement et des moyens de le guérir, 1844.
- De l'empirisme en médecine, 1844.
- La Séméiotique des urines, ou Traité des signes fournis par les urines dans les maladies, 1845.
- Traité clinique des maladies de l'utérus, 1859.
- Des applications de l'électricité à la thérapeutique médicale, 1853, 2nd edition 1860.
- Traité élémentaire d'hygiène privée et publique, Paris, Asselin, 1854, 4th edition 1868.
