= Maxime Vernois =

Ange-Gabriel-Maxime Vernois (4 January 1809 in Lagny-sur-Marne – 9 February 1877 in Paris) was a French medical hygienist, known for his work in the field of occupational health and safety.

He studied medicine in Paris, and from 1834 worked as a medical interne under Gabriel Andral at the Hôpital de la Pitié. In 1837 he received his doctorate with a dissertation-thesis on arterial bruits. From 1844 he was associated with Bureau Central des Hôpitaux in Paris, then in 1848 began work as a physician at the Hôpital Saint-Antoine.

In 1852 he became a member of the Conseil d'hygiène publique et de salubrité for the département of Seine, serving as its vice-president in 1860. He was a co-founder of the Société de médecine légale, and in 1861 was elected as a member to the Académie de médecine.

== Selected works ==
In 1862 he published an influential study of diseases and injuries to the hands associated with 150 different professions, titled "De la main des ouvriers et des artisans au point de vue de l'hygiène et de la médecine légale. Other noteworthy written works by Vernois are:

- Homoeopathie : analyse complète et raisonnée de la matière médicale de Samuel Hahnemann, (1835) – Homeopathy: full analysis and rationale in regards to the materia medica of Samuel Hahnemann.
- Études physiologiques et cliniques pour servir à l'histoire des bruits des artères, (1837) – Physiological and clinical studies in regards to arterial bruits.
- Mémoire sur les dimensions du coeur chez l'enfant nouveau-né : suivi de recherches comparatives sur les mesures de cet organe à l'état adulte, (1840) – Dimensions of the heart in newborn children.
- Du diagnostic anatomique des maladies du foie et de sa valeur au point de vue thérapeutique, (1844) – Anatomical diagnosis of liver diseases and its value from a therapeutic standpoint.
- Du lait chez la femme dans l'état de santé et dans l'état de maladie; mémoire suivi de nouvelles recherches sur la composition du lait chez la vache, la chèvre, la jument, la brebis, et la chienne (with Louis Alfred Becquerel), (1853).
- Traité pratique d'hygiène industrielle et administrative, comprenant l'étude des établissements insalubres, dangereux et incommodes, (1860) – Practical treatise on industrial and administrative hygiene, including a study of substandard, unsafe and inconvenient facilities.
- Etat hygiénique des lycées de l'Empire en 1867 (1868) – The state of health in regards to high schools in 1867.
