= Phosphoroscope =

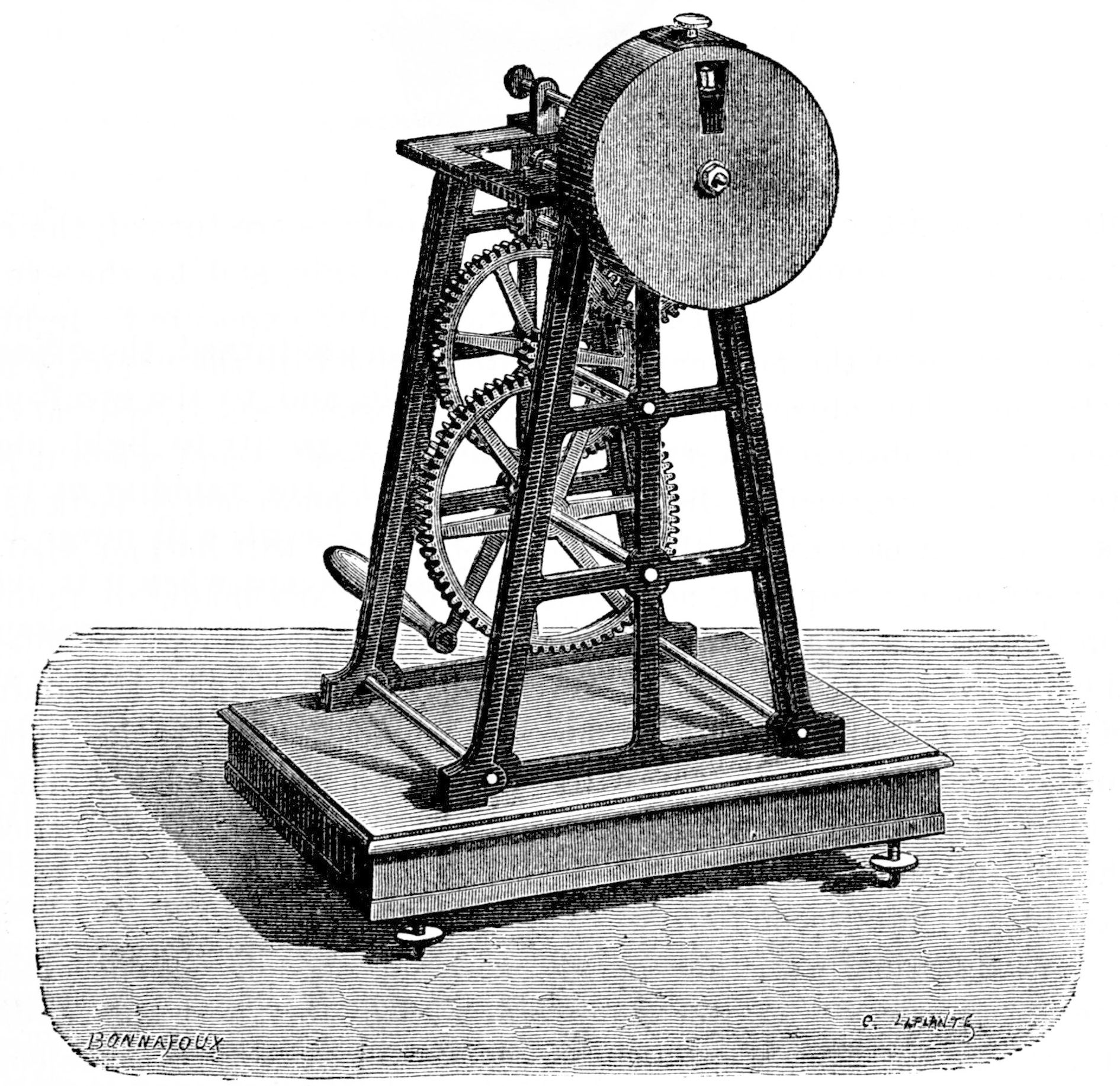
The Becquerel phosphoroscope (1873-1874)

A phosphoroscope is piece of experimental equipment devised in 1857 by physicist A. E. Becquerel to measure how long it takes a phosphorescent material to stop glowing after it has been excited.

It consists of two rotating disks with holes in them. The holes are arranged on each disk at equal angular intervals and a constant distance from the centre, but the holes in one disk do not align with the holes in the other. A sample of phosphorescent material is placed in between the two disks. Light coming in through a hole in one of the discs excites the phosphorescent material, which then emits light for a short amount of time. The disks are then rotated, and by changing their speed, the length of time the material glows can be determined.
