= Two-photon photovoltaic effect =

Phenomenon in applied physics

Two-photon photovoltaic effect (TPP effect) is an energy collection method based on two-photon absorption (TPA). The TPP effect can be thought of as the nonlinear equivalent of the traditional photovoltaic effect involving high optical intensities. This effect occurs when two photons are absorbed at the same time resulting in an electron-hole pair.

== Background ==
TPA is typically several orders of magnitude weaker than linear absorption at low light intensities. It differs from linear absorption in that the optical transition rate due to TPA depends on the square of the light intensity, thus it is a nonlinear optical process and can dominate over linear absorption at high intensities. Therefore, the power dissipation from the TPA and the resulting free carrier scattering are harmful problems in semiconductor devices which operate based on the nonlinear optical interactions such as the Kerr and Raman effects, when dealing with high intensities. The TPP effect is studied as a possible solution to this double crisis on energy efficiency.

Although some improvements and theoretical investigation on the field have been done in the past, the concrete application of the effect was numerically and experimentally analysed for the first time by Bahram Jalali and colleagues in 2006 in Silicon.

== Physics ==
TPP effect devices are based on waveguides with lateral p–n junction diodes, in which the pump power is nonlinearly lost due to TPA and free-carrier absorption (FCA) along the z-direction, perpendicular to the junction x-y cross-section.

Coupled optical intensity is governed by the following equation:

$\frac{dI_{p}(z)}{dz}= \underbrace{-(\alpha+\alpha_{FCA})I_{p}(z)}_{\text{Linear absorption}} - \underbrace{\beta I^2_{p}(z)}_{\text{TPA}}$	1

where:

α is the linear absorption coefficient;
β the TPA coefficient;
and α_{FCA} is called the FCA coefficient which is given by Soref´s expression.

Carrier photogeneration rate is defined by:

$G=\frac{dN}{dt}=-\frac{dI_{TPA}}{dz} \cdot \frac{1}{2E_{p}}=\frac{\beta I^2_{p}}{2E_{p}}$

where E_{p} is the energy of the photon and the factor $\tfrac{1}{2}$ is due to the fact that there are two photons involved in the process.

Photocurrent per unit length: $I_{G}=q\cdot A_{eff} \cdot G$, where $A_{eff}$ is the effective area of the waveguide and q is the electron charge. For a waveguide of length L, we have

$$I_{G}=\frac{\beta q A_{eff}}{2E_{p}}\int_0^LI^2_{p}(z) dz$$

We define $I_{p0}$ as the coupled pump intensity at $z=0$. Therefore, we obtain the following expression:

$$I_{G}=\frac{\beta q A_{eff} I^2_{p0}}{2E_{p}}\int_0^L\frac{I^2_{p}(z)}{I^2_{p0}}dz$$	2

$L_{NL}=\int_0^L\frac{I^2_{p}(z)}{I^2_{p0}}dz$

This last expression is called the effective length which is the nonlinear equivalent to the interaction length defined in optical fibers. Contribution to carrier injection and recombination to the total current need to be considered as well so that the total photodiode current is expressed as:

$I_{T}=I_{G}+I_{D}+I_{R}$	3

The Shockley equation gives I–V (current-voltage) characteristic of an idealized diode:

$I_{D}=I_{s}(e^\frac{qV_{s}}{k_{B}T}-1)$	4

The value of $I_s$ is called the reverse bias saturation current and is defined by:

$$I_{s}=qhL\cdot (\frac{D_{n}n_{p0}}{L_{n}}+\frac{D_{p}p_{n0}}{L_{p}})$$

where h and L are defined in Fig. 1 and the remaining parameters have the usual meaning defined in reference Sze's Physics of semiconductor devices.

The Shockley equation is valid since photogeneration in the N and P doped regions is negligible in the p–n diode. This contrasts the conventional solar cell theory, where photogeneration predominantly occurs in the N and P doped regions as shown in Fig. 2.

Due to PIN structure (Figure 2) we have to take into account the recombination current which we approximate by Shockley–Read–Hall recombination given by :

$I_{R}=\frac{qh(W+2d)LN_{eff}}{\tau_{n}+\tau_{p}}$	5

where $W+2d$ is defined in Fig.1, $N_{eff}$ is the effective carrier density along $\hat{z}$ and $\tau_{n}$ and $\tau_{p}$ are the electron and hole bulk recombination lifetimes, respectively.

In a circuit, power dissipation refers to the rate at which energy is lost due to resistive elements and is defined traditionally as follows:

$P=-I_{G}\cdot V_{m}$	6

We now define collection efficiency, which is number of carriers/photons consumed by TPA:

$\eta_{c}=\frac{I_{T}}{2I_{G}}$	7

This is appropriate for such devices as amplifiers and wavelength converters where energy harvesting is a useful byproduct but not the main functionality of the device itself. If the TPP effect is intended to be used in a photovoltaic cell, then the power efficiency $\eta_p$ should be considered.

First, external quantum efficiency is given by $\eta_{ext}=\eta_{coupling} \cdot \eta_{q}$, where $n_{coupling}$ refers to the coupling efficiency of the light into the waveguide and

$\eta_{q}=\frac{E_{p}I_{T}}{qI_{p0}A_{eff}}$

which can be approximated to:

$\eta_{q}(V_{m}) \approx \frac{\beta L_{NL} I_{p0}}{2}$

Finally, power efficiency is given by:

$\eta_{p}=\eta_{ext}\cdot \frac{qV}{E_{p}} \approx \frac{\eta_{coupling}q\beta}{2E_{p}}V_{m}L_{NL}I_{p0}$	8

=== Intermediate band ===
Conventional solar cells rely on one-photon transitions between the valence (VB) and conduction band (CB) of a semiconductor. The use of an intermediate state in the bandgap was first described by Luque and Martí in 1997. They showed that with the addition of an intermediate level to the band diagram of a solar cell, the theoretical efficiency limit can be improved to well beyond that of the Shockley-Queisser model. This improvement is possible through the capture of sub-bandgap photons. The presence of an intermediate band will allow the absorption of such photons resulting in the generation of electron-hole pairs, adding to those created by direct optical transitions. In two independent electron excitations, photons are absorbed with transitions from valence (VB) to intermediate band (IB) and from intermediate (IB) to conduction band (VB). In order to achieve optimal results, any devices and processes are assumed ideal as associated conditions include infinite carrier mobility, full absorption of desired photons, partial filling of the IB in order to both donate and receive electrons and no possibility of extracting current from the IB. Within this framework, the limiting efficiency of an intermediate-band solar cell (IBSC) has been calculated to be 63.1%.

The presence of an intermediate band can be the result of several techniques, but most notably of the introduction of impurities in the crystal structure. Multiple rare-earth elements are known to produce the required states between bands in a semiconductor material in this way. Increasing the concentration of such impurities leads to the possibility of shaping an intermediate band, as demonstrated in GaAs alloys. An interesting alternative is the use of quantum dot technology. A solar cell can be designed to include a region of a quantum dot structure that induces the desired confined state. In 2001, Martí et al. proposed a feasible method to meet the condition of a half-filled band. There is still active research on which materials demonstrate such desired characteristics as well as the synthesis of such materials.

The basic workings of an IBSC device were first proven to be effective in the production of a photocurrent by Martí et al. in 2006.

== Materials ==
Semiconductor materials are so relevant due to the fact that their conducting properties can be altered in useful ways by introducing impurities ("doping") into the crystal structure. Where two differently-doped regions exist in the same crystal, a semiconductor junction is created. The development of these junctions is the basis of diodes, transistors and all modern electronics. Examples of semiconductors are silicon, germanium, gallium arsenide. After silicon, gallium arsenide is the second most common semiconductor.

=== Silicon (Si) ===
Silicon photonics has been widely studied since pioneering works of Soref and Petermann in the late 1980s and early 1990s due to the desire to create low-cost photonic devices by taking advantage of the strong silicon manufacturing infrastructure. Silicon wafers have the lowest cost (per unit area) and the highest crystal quality of any semiconductor material.

However, the case for silicon photonics is even stronger. Silicon has excellent material properties that are important in photonic devices:

- high thermal conductivity (~10× higher than GaAs),
- high optical damage threshold (~10× higher than GaAs),
- high third-order optical nonlinearities

This last point is actually essential for the examination of the TPP effect. High index contrast between silicon (n =3.45) and SiO2 (n =1.45) makes it possible to scale photonic devices to the hundreds of nanometer level. Such lateral and vertical dimensions are required for true compatibility with IC processing. In addition, the high optical intensity arising from the large index contrast (between Si and SiO2) makes it possible to observe nonlinear optical interactions, such as Raman and Kerr effects, in chip-scale devices.

For these reasons, Silicon has been commonly used as the material for the conventional photovoltaic effect. Due to the Shockley–Queisser limit it is known that a single p-n junction photovoltaic cell maximum solar conversion efficiency is around 33.7% for a bandgap of 1.34eV. However, Silicon has a bandgap of 1.1eV, corresponding to an efficiency of 32%.

However, for TPP effect results of collection efficiency defined in (7) are plotted in Fig 4 as function of voltage with different pump intensities.

A good agreement is shown in Fig. 4 among the experimental, analytical and numerical simulated models. An interpolation of the data can be made to show a collection efficiency around 43% for $V\rightarrow0$ in low high pumps, which really approaches to the theoretical limit set in 50%. However, is not exactly the same for high pump intensity. This limit of collection efficiency leads to a relatively low inherent efficiency of around 5.5%.

Any imaginable means that improves beta can enhance the power efficiency of the present approach and FCA is lower at shorter wavelengths increasing $L_{NL}$. Combining these two effects could be translated into a higher limit efficiency on TPP effect predicted.

=== Gallium Arsenide (GaAs) ===
Gallium arsenide (GaAs) is an important semiconductor material for high-cost, high-efficiency solar cells and is used for single-crystalline thin-film solar cells as well as multi-junction solar cells.

Every two photons lost to TPA generate one electron-hole pair in the semiconductor material and these photogenerated carriers are available for photovoltaic conversion into electrical power as shown in Figure 5 for two particular wavelengths ($\lambda=976nm,1550nm$).

TPA has been observed experimentally in gallium arsenide (GaAs) and its coefficient, β, calculated in GaAs at 1.3 μm is 42.5 cm/GW (much higher than silicon's: 3.3 cm/GW ). Moreover, at the telecommunication wavelength of 1.55 μm, β is reported to be around 15 cm/GW in GaAs compared with 0.7 cm/GW in silicon. Thus, the TPP effect is expected to be stronger in GaAs.

In order to get experimental data to compare to the theoretical analysis, Figure 6 illustrates how TPP can be realized in a single-mode GaAs/AlGaAs waveguide using a p-i-n junction diode.

The Shockley–Read–Hall recombination is taken into account in this model, assuming the trap energy level is located in the middle of the bandgap. The electron and hole bulk recombination lifetimes, $\tau_n$ and $\tau_p$, in bulk GaAs are of the order of 10−8 s, about 2 orders of magnitude smaller than those in bulk silicon. Surface recombination reduces the power efficiency of the TPP effect as the electrons and holes recombine before they are collected at the contacts.

The TPP effect is more efficient at 976 nm due to larger β. For a 5-cm long device at 150 mW power efficiency up to 8% is theoretically predicted which is higher than those achievable in silicon.

== Potential applications ==
A potential application of the two-photon photovoltaic effect is remote power delivery to physical sensors installed in critical environments where electrical sparks are dangerous and copper cables must be avoided.
