= Vernal (Martian crater) =

Vernal Crater
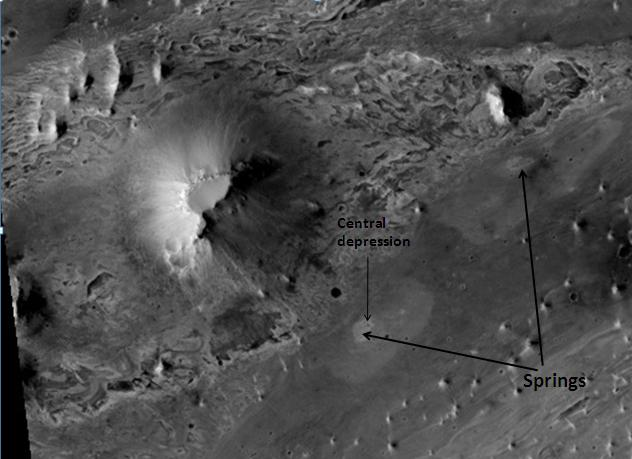
- Springs in Vernal Crater, as seen by HIRISE.
- Planet: Mars
- Coordinates: 6°N 355.5°E
- Quadrangle: Oxia Palus
- Diameter: 55.51 km (34.49 mi)
- Eponym: Vernal, Utah, United States

Vernal is a crater on Mars, located at 6°N, 355.5°E in the Oxia Palus quadrangle. It is measures approximately 55.51 kilometres (34.49 mi) in diameter and was named after Vernal, Utah, United States. Structures resembling springs on Earth were found in Vernal crater.

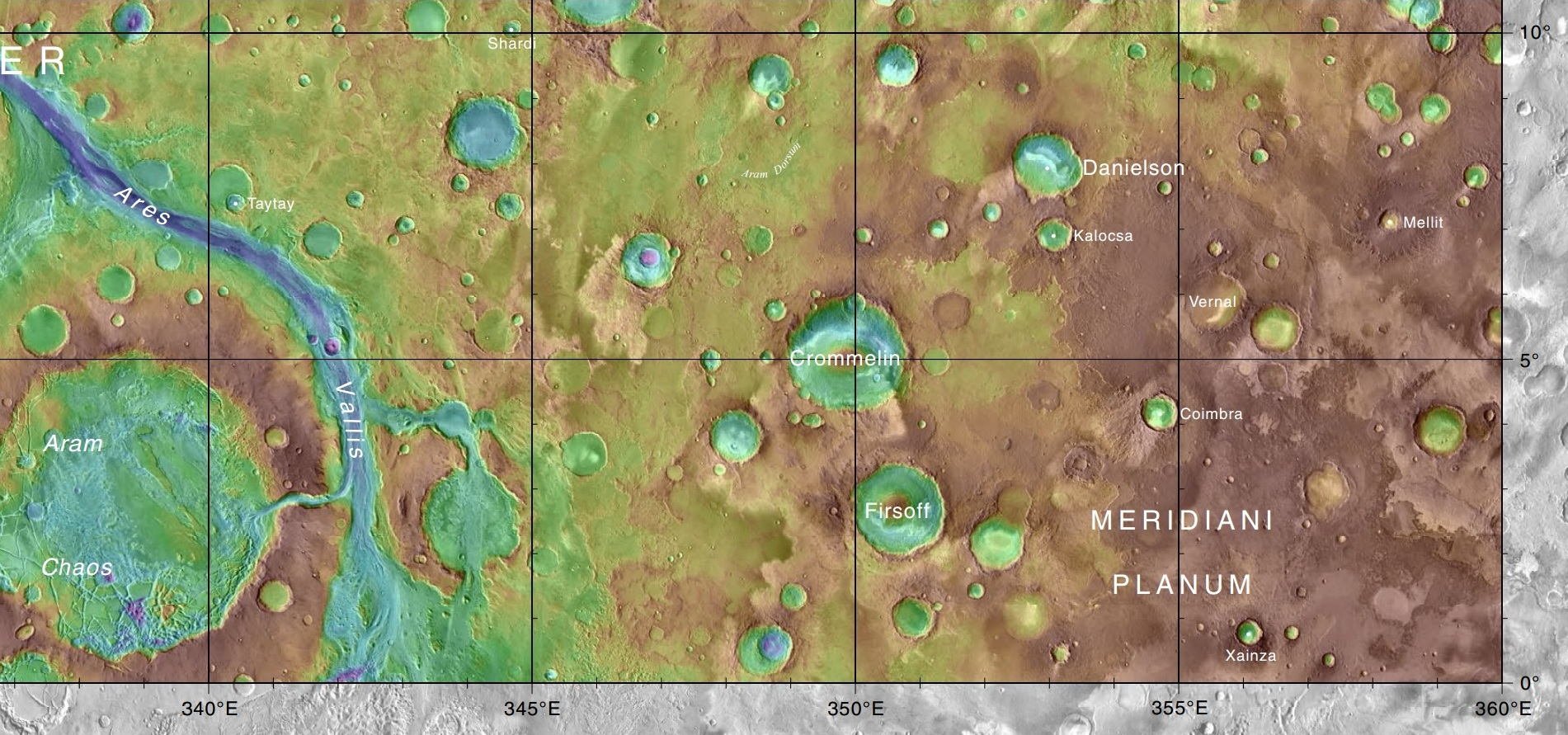
MOLA map showing Vernal Crater and other nearby craters. Colors indicate elevations.

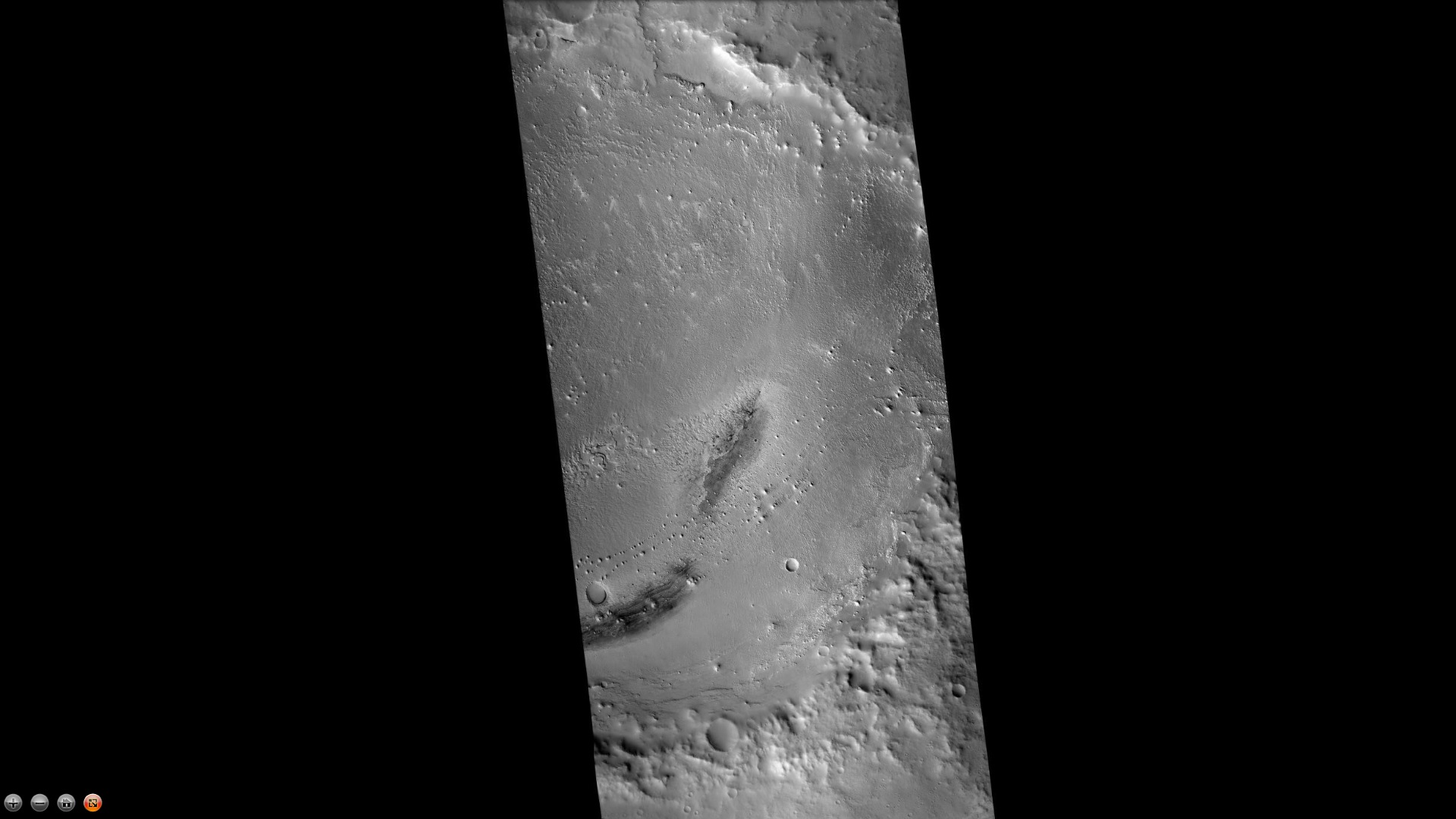
Vernal Crater, as seen by CTX camera (on Mars Reconnaissance Orbiter).

== Springs ==
A study of images taken with the High Resolution Imaging Science Experiment (HiRISE) on the Mars Reconnaissance Orbiter suggests that hot springs once existed in Vernal crater, in the Oxia Palus quadrangle. These springs may have provided a long-time location for life. Furthermore, mineral deposits associated with these springs may have preserved traces of Martian life. In Vernal Crater, on a dark part of the floor two light-toned, elliptical structures closely resemble hot springs on the Earth. They have inner and outer halos, with roughly circular depressions. Many hills are lined up close to the springs. These are thought to have formed by the movement of fluids along the boundaries of dipping beds. The discovery of opaline silica by the Mars Rovers on the surface also suggests the presence of hot springs. Scientists proposed this area as one to be visited by the Mars Science Laboratory.

== See also ==
- Climate of Mars
- Geological history of Mars
- Geology of Mars
- List of craters on Mars
- Water on Mars
