= Jean Becquerel =

French physicist (1878–1953)

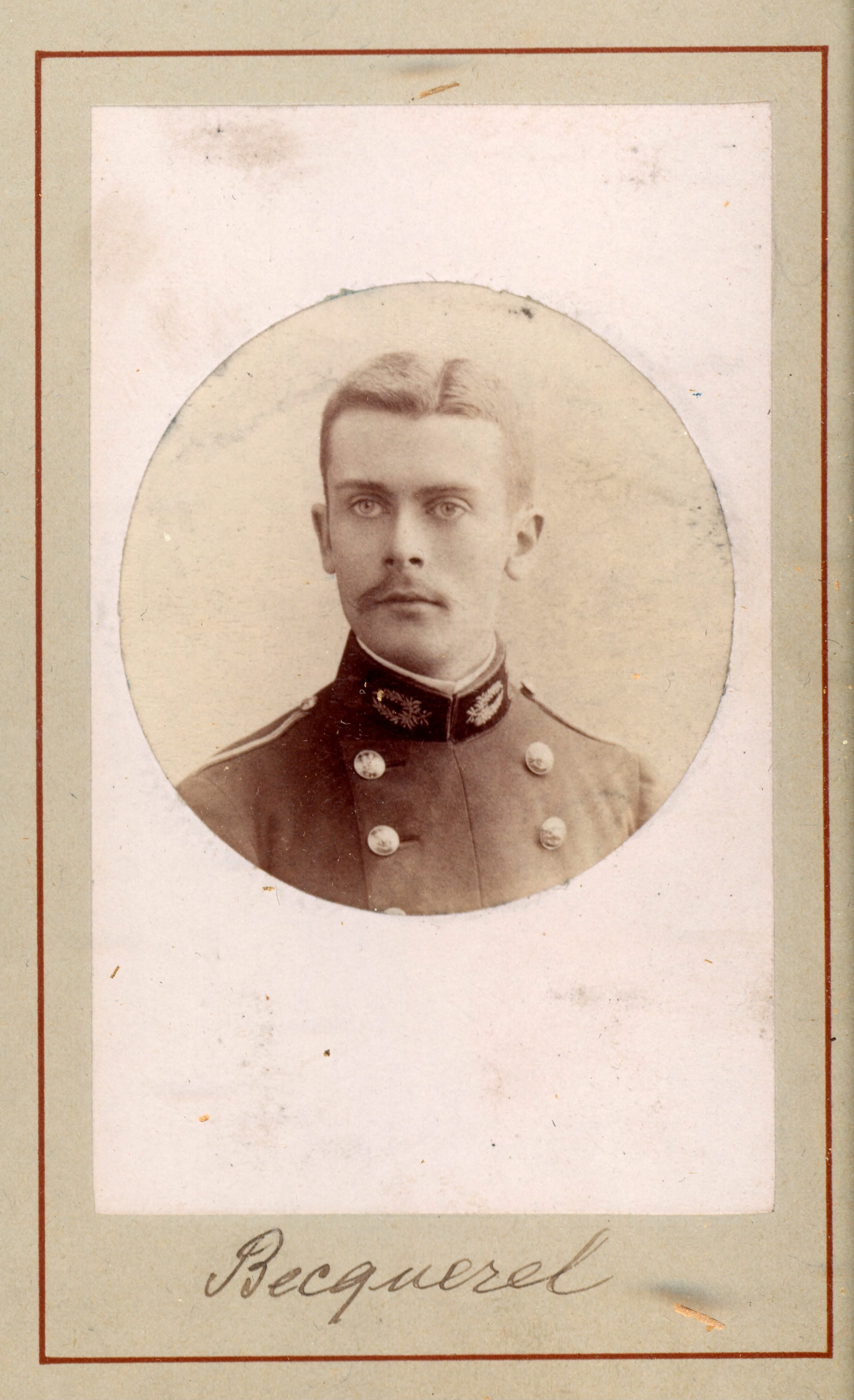
- Jean Becquerel in 1899, photo by Pierre Petit
- Born: 5 February 1878; Paris
- Died: 4 July 1953 (aged 75)
- Education: Lycée Louis-le-Grand; École Polytechnique, École des Ponts et Chaussées
- Known for: Very low temperature
- Father: Antoine-Henri Becquerel
- Relatives: Edmond Becquerel (grandfather), Antoine César Becquerel (great-grandfather)
- Awards: Hughes Prize (1913), La Case Prize (1936)
- Scientific career
- Fields: Physics

Jean Antoine Edmond Marie Becquerel (5 February 1878 – 4 July 1953) was a French physicist, the son of Henri Becquerel. He worked on a range of experimental physics topics including magnetic effects on the optical properties of materials, and the effects of low-temperature on magnetic susceptibility. He was among the early teachers of relativity and quantum physics in France.

== Biography ==
Becquerel was born at his home in the Jardin des Plantes where his father Henri (1852–1908), grandfather Edmond (1820–1891) and great-grandfather Antoine César Becquerel (1788–1878) had lived. His mother Lucie was the daughter of J.C. Jamin, professor of physics at the Sorbonne. His childhood toys included magnets and electroscopes. He was educated at the Lycée Louis-le-Grand before going to the École Polytechnique in 1897 and completed his studies at the École des Ponts et Chaussées.

He then became an assistant in physics at the National Museum of Natural History, France. He worked on the optical and magnetic properties of crystals, and continued experiments to study changes in rotational polarisation induced by a magnetic field that his father had discovered. He also published a textbook on relativity In 1903 some of his research came into question when he collaborated with surgeon André Broca to examine the radiation of N-rays, supposedly emanating from living bodies (as claimed originally by René Blondlot) which was claimed to reduce upon the administration of anaesthetics.

In 1909, he became the fourth in his family to occupy the physics chair at the National Museum of Natural History, following in the footsteps of his father, his grandfather and his great-grandfather. He taught physics along with Paul Langevin and was among the few who taught quantum mechanics and the theory of relativity in the 1920s. He was interested in the electron and examined magnetic susceptibility in relation to temperature and began to experiment with rare-earth crystals at low temperatures. He examined these using spectroscopy and found that some absorption bands disappeared and this led to a collaboration with Heike Kamerlingh Onnes at Leiden. Here he examined materials at low-temperatures and described the spectra and looked at magnetic properties.

Becquerel received the Hughes Prize of 1913 and the La Case Prize of 1936.

== Selected works ==
- Le Principe de relativité et la théorie de la gravitation, Lectures given in 1921 and 1922 at the École Polytechnique and the Muséum d'Histoire Naturelle in Paris, Gauthier-Villars & Co. 1922
- Exposé élémentaire de la théorie d’Einstein et de sa généralisation, suivi d’un appendice à l’usage des mathématiciens, collection Payot, Payot et Cie, Paris, 1922
