= Becquerel (Martian crater) =

Crater on Mars

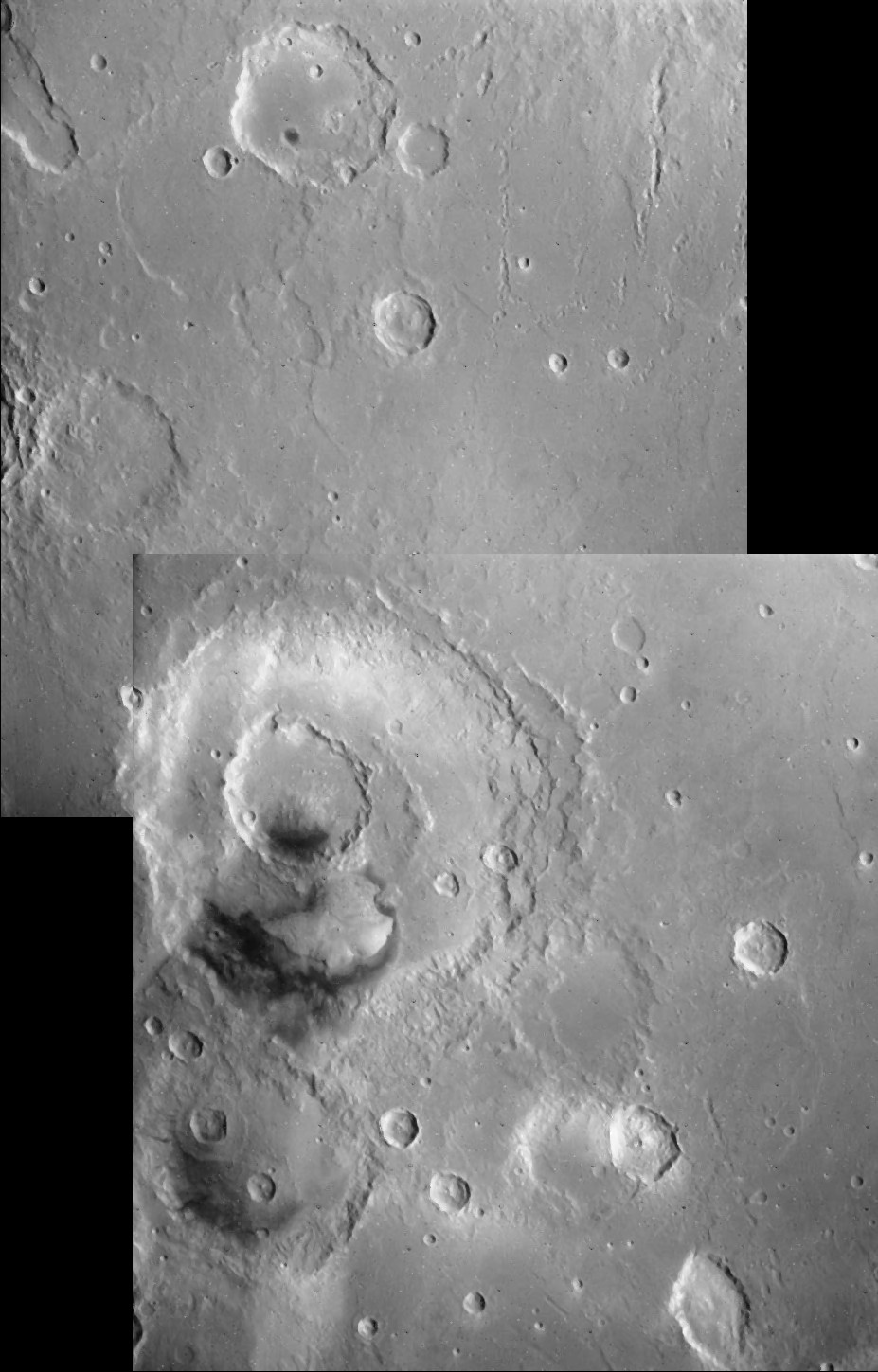
- Viking Orbiter 1 mosaic with Becquerel at center
- Planet: Mars
- Region: Arabia Terra
- Coordinates: 22.1°N 352.0°E
- Quadrangle: Oxia Palus
- Diameter: 167 km
- Eponym: Antoine H. Becquerel

Becquerel is a 167 km-diameter crater at 22.1°N, 352.0°E on Mars, in Arabia Terra in Oxia Palus quadrangle. It is named after Antoine H. Becquerel.

Photographs by the Mars Global Surveyor revealed layered sedimentary rocks in the crater. The layers appear to be only a few meters thick and show little variations in thickness. Recent studies with HiRISE have determined the exact thickness of the layers. The 66 layers measured showed one group of layers to average 3.6 metres (12 ft) and another group to average 36 metres (118 ft) in thickness. Patterns like this are usually produced on Earth through the effects of water; volcanic deposits would not produce ash or laval flows of such regular thickness and in any event, there are no nearby volcanic vents.

There are cyclic variations in the thickness of the exposed sedimentary layers, possibly indicating cyclic variations in environmental conditions while the sediment was being laid down. Most of the layers are parallel to each other, suggesting they formed by vertical settling, but a few are cross-bedded, indicating that at the time that the layers were deposited the sediment was transported along the ground surface by wind or water. The sedimentary material appears to be easily eroded and active wind erosion may be continuing to the current day.

Parts of the mound in Becquerel crater show radial faults, These may be the result of a salt diapir. On Earth these are associated with methane seepage. Perhaps the methane detected on Mars from time to time is coming from these faults.

Some parts of Becquerel show light-toned layers. Light-toned rocks on Mars have been associated with hydrated minerals like sulfates. The Mars rover Opportunity examined such layers close-up with several instruments. Scientists are excited about finding hydrated minerals such as sulfates and clays on Mars because they are usually formed in the presence of water. Places that contain clays and/or other hydrated minerals would be good places to look for evidence of life.

Many craters once contained lakes. Because some crater floors show deltas, we know that water had to be present for some time. Dozens of deltas have been spotted on Mars. Deltas form when sediment is washed in from a stream entering a quiet body of water. It takes a bit of time to form a delta, so the presence of a delta is exciting; it means water was there for a time, maybe for many years. Primitive organisms may have developed in such lakes; hence, some craters may be prime targets for the search for evidence of life on the Red Planet.

== Gallery ==
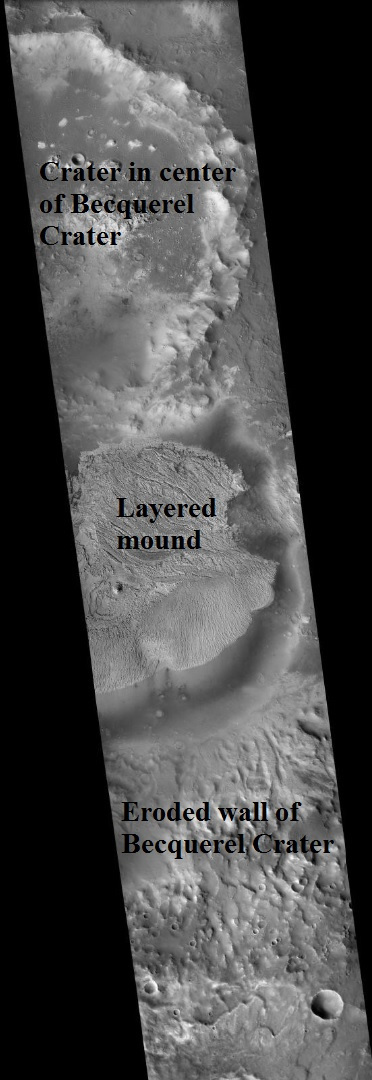
Becquerel Crater with parts labeled, as seen by CTX camera (on Mars Reconnaissance Orbiter).

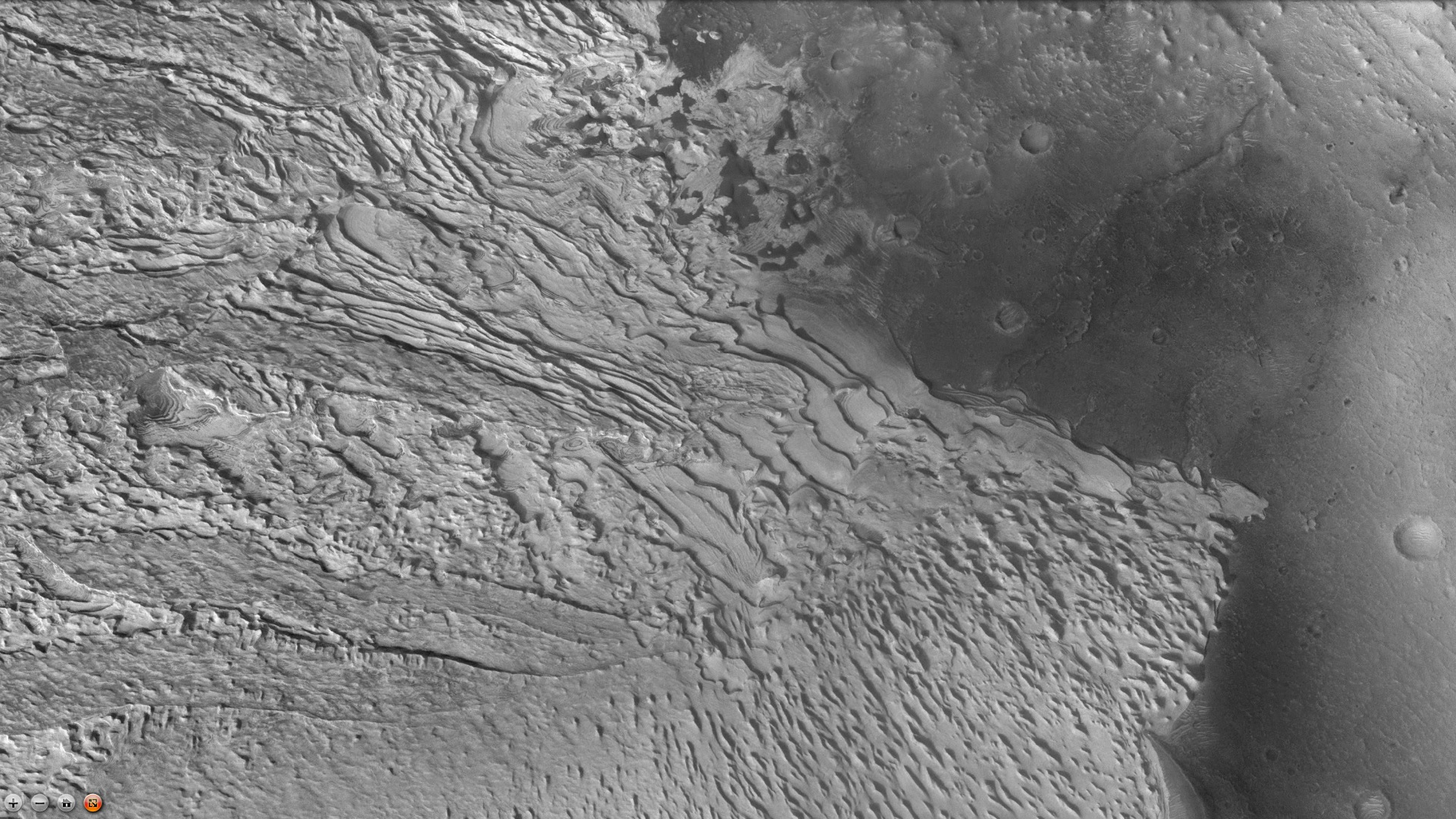
Layers in Becquerel Crater mound, as seen by CTX camera (on Mars Reconnaissance Orbiter). Note: this is an enlargement of the previous image.

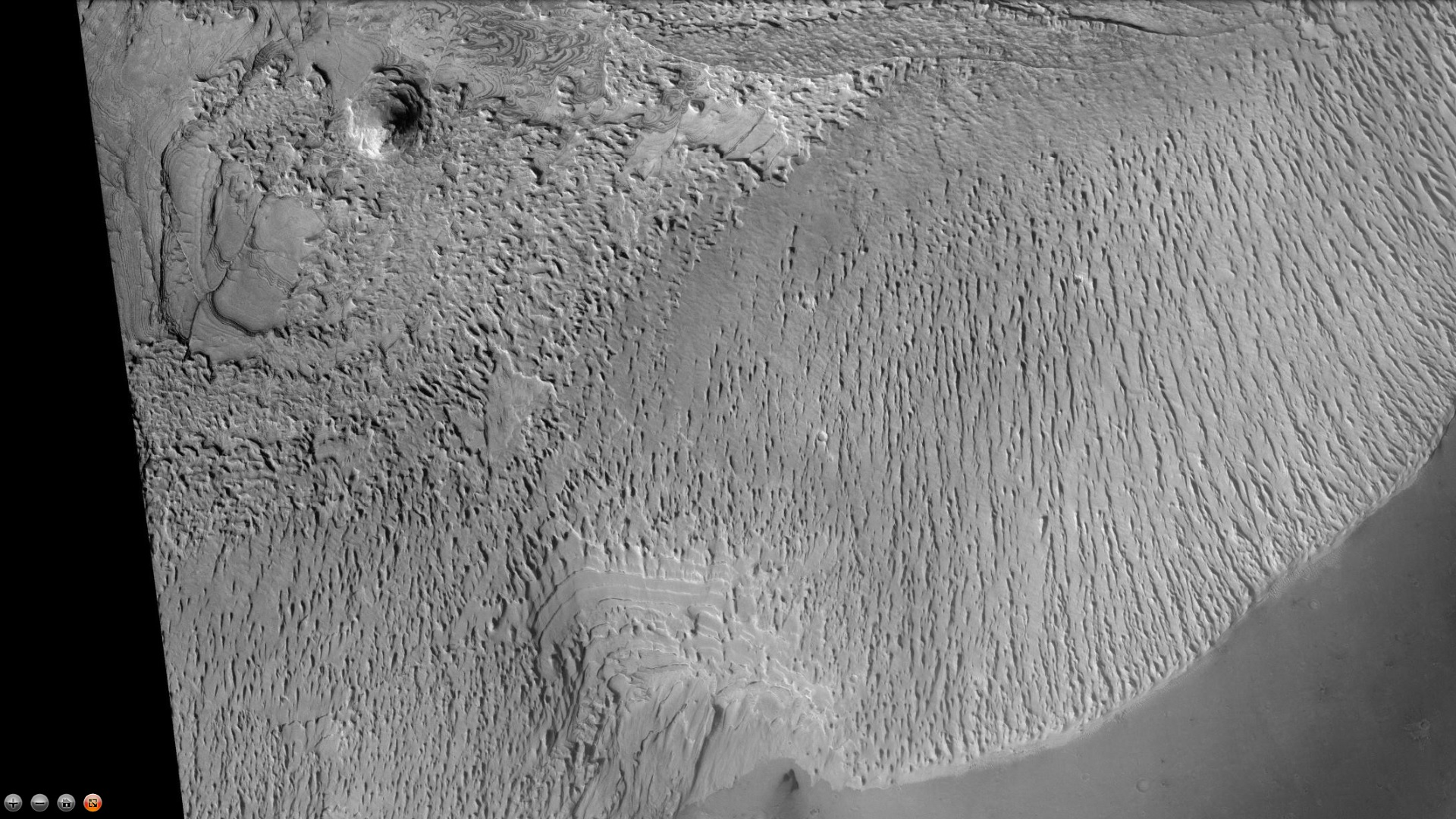
Layers in southern portion of Becquerel Crater mound, as seen by CTX camera (on Mars Reconnaissance Orbiter). Note: this is an enlargement of a previous image.
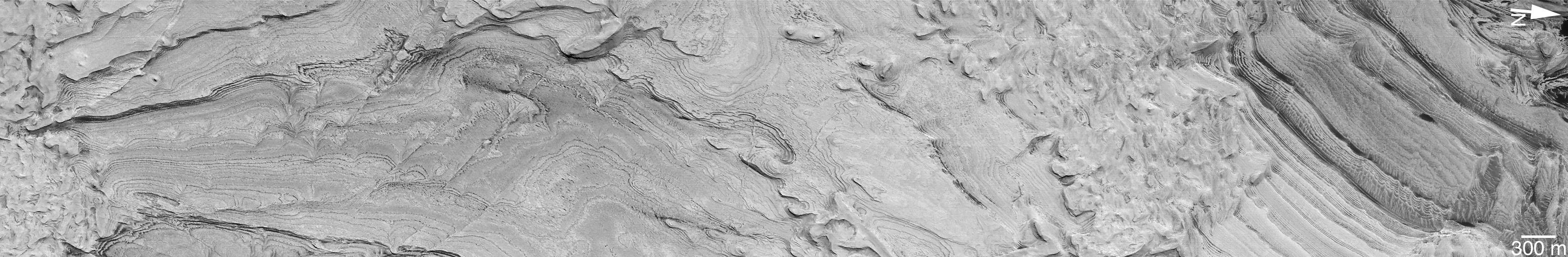
Layers in the Martian crater Becquerel
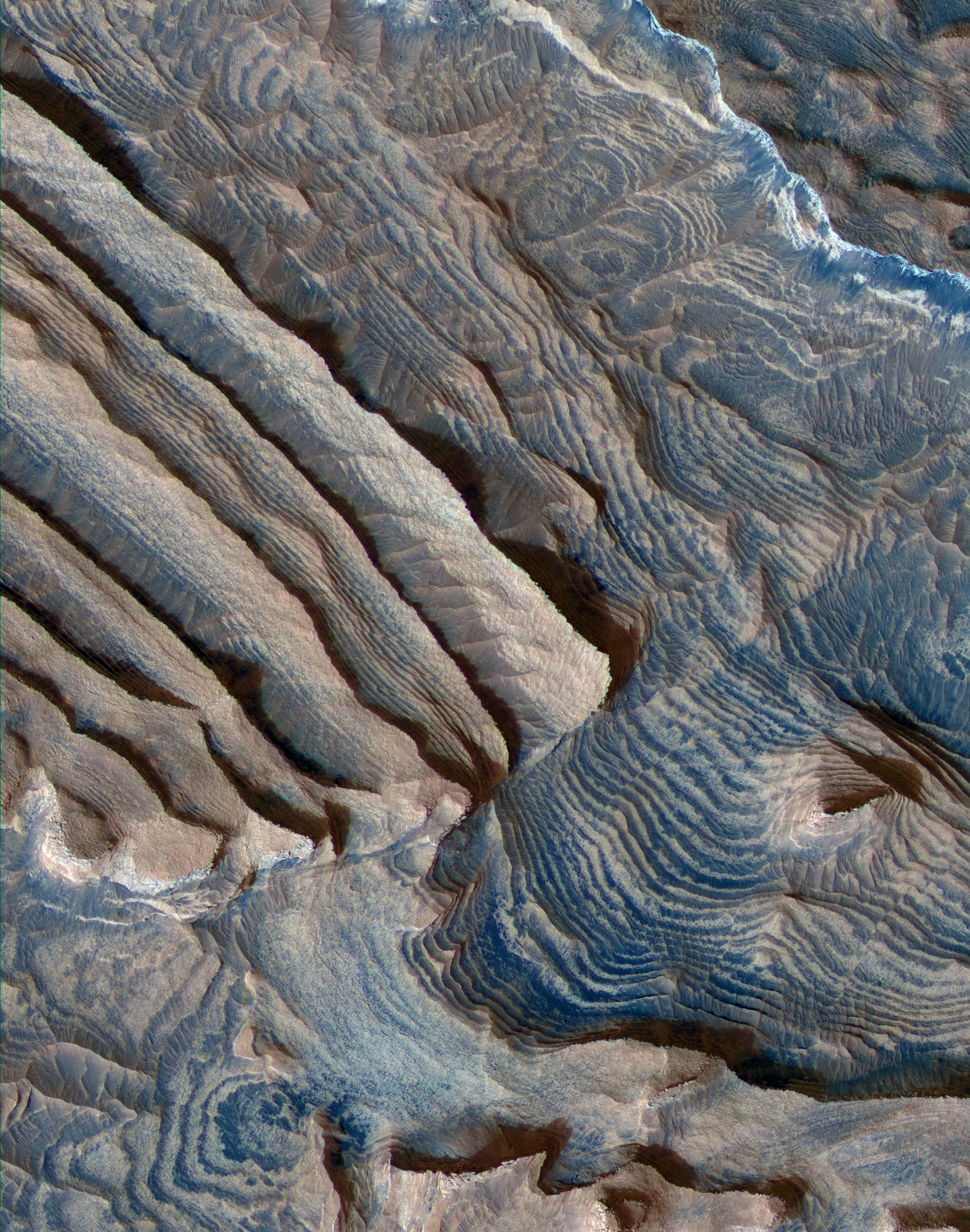
Closeup of the periodic layering in Becquerel crater

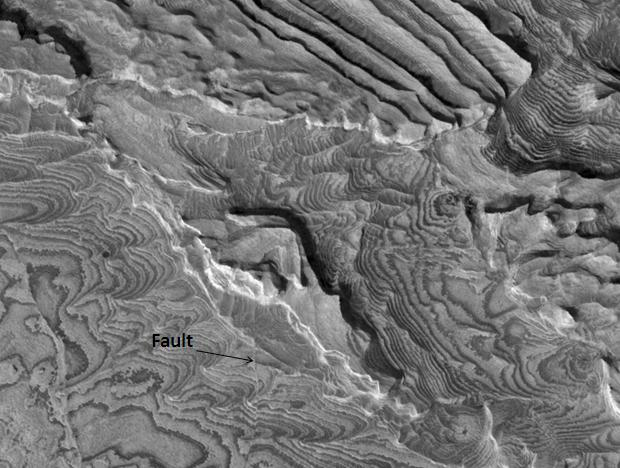
Becquerel crater layers with a fault, as seen by HiRISE.

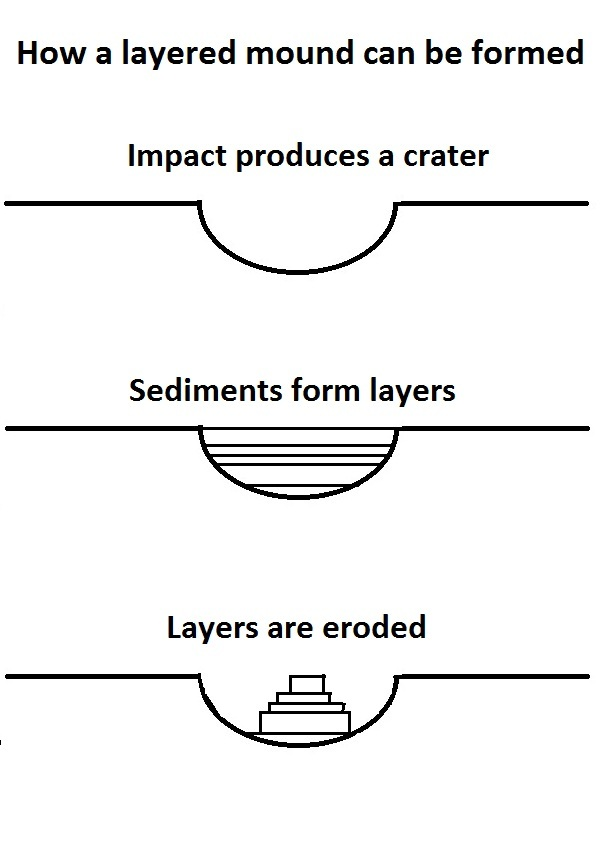
Mounds in craters showing layers are formed by the erosion of layers that were deposited after the impact.

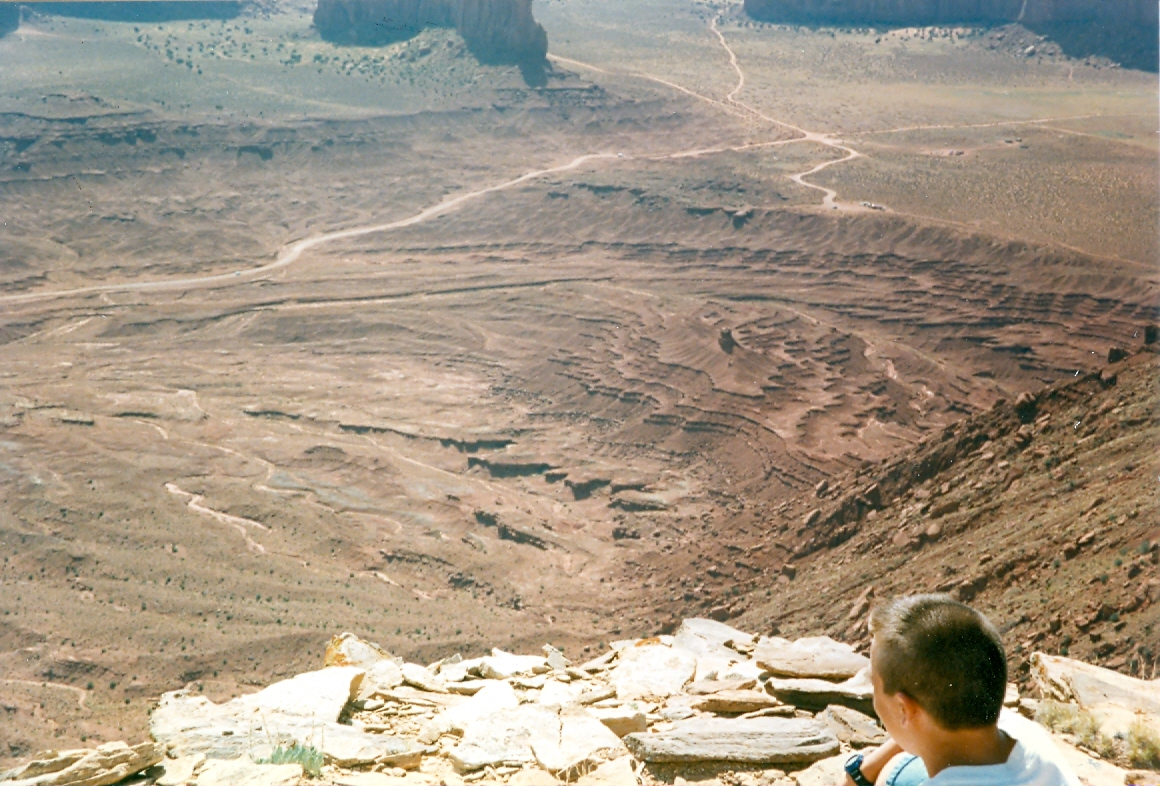
Layers in Monument Valley on Earth, for comparison.

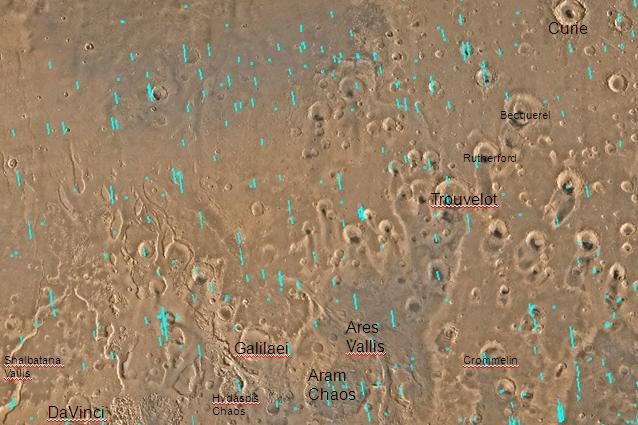
Quadrangle map of Oxia Palus labeled with major features. This quadrangle contains many collapsed areas (chaos) and many outflow channels (old river valleys). Becquerel is in the upper right.

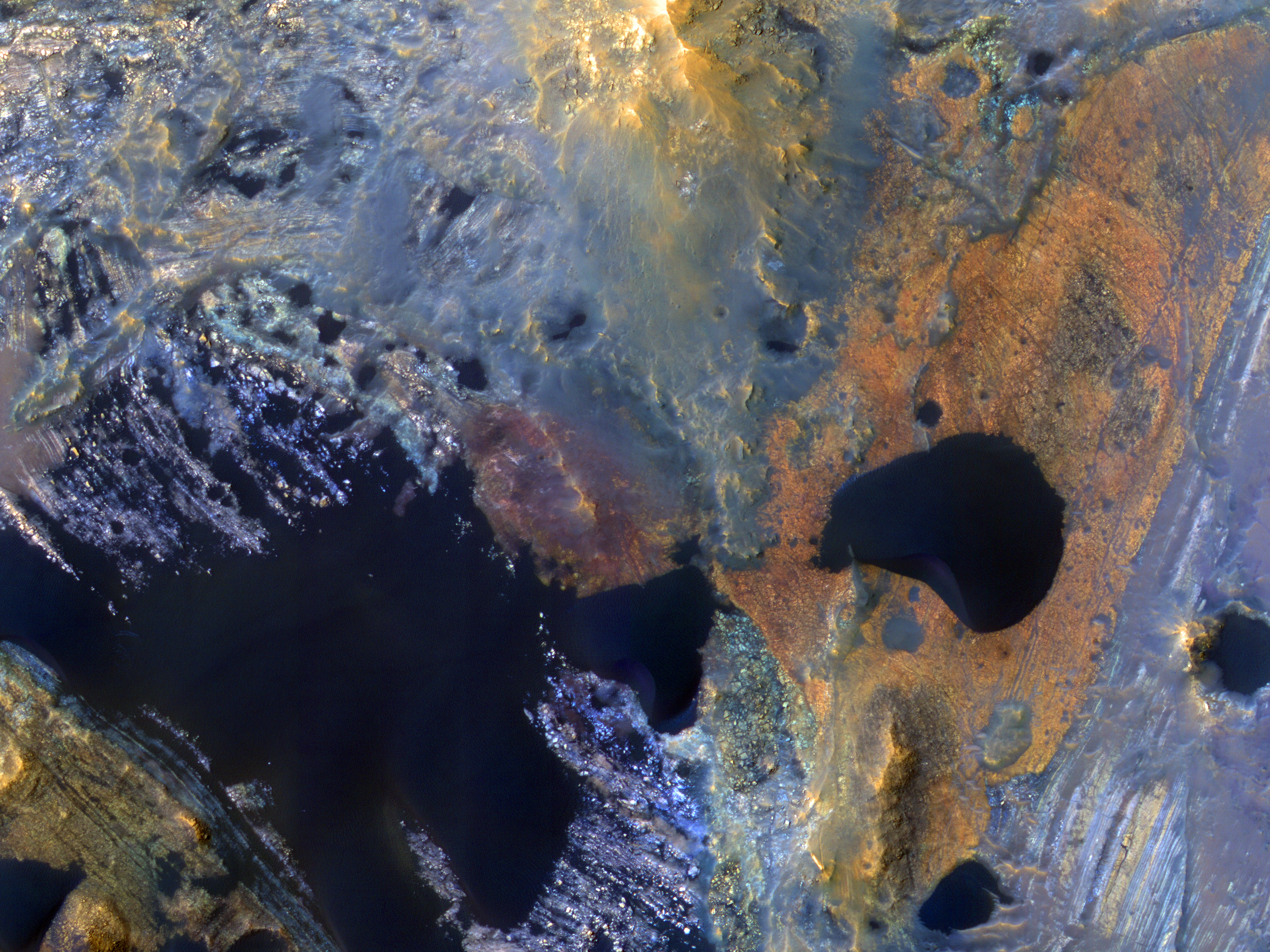
There is a crater nearly 50 kilometers in diameter inside the 167-kilometer Becquerel crater. This image shows layered blocks tilted at high angles, diverse color and textures and dark dunes. Some of the bedrock may have originated at great depths, uplifted first by Becquerel and later by the unnamed 50-kilometer crater. Very complex geology here.

== Topographic Map ==
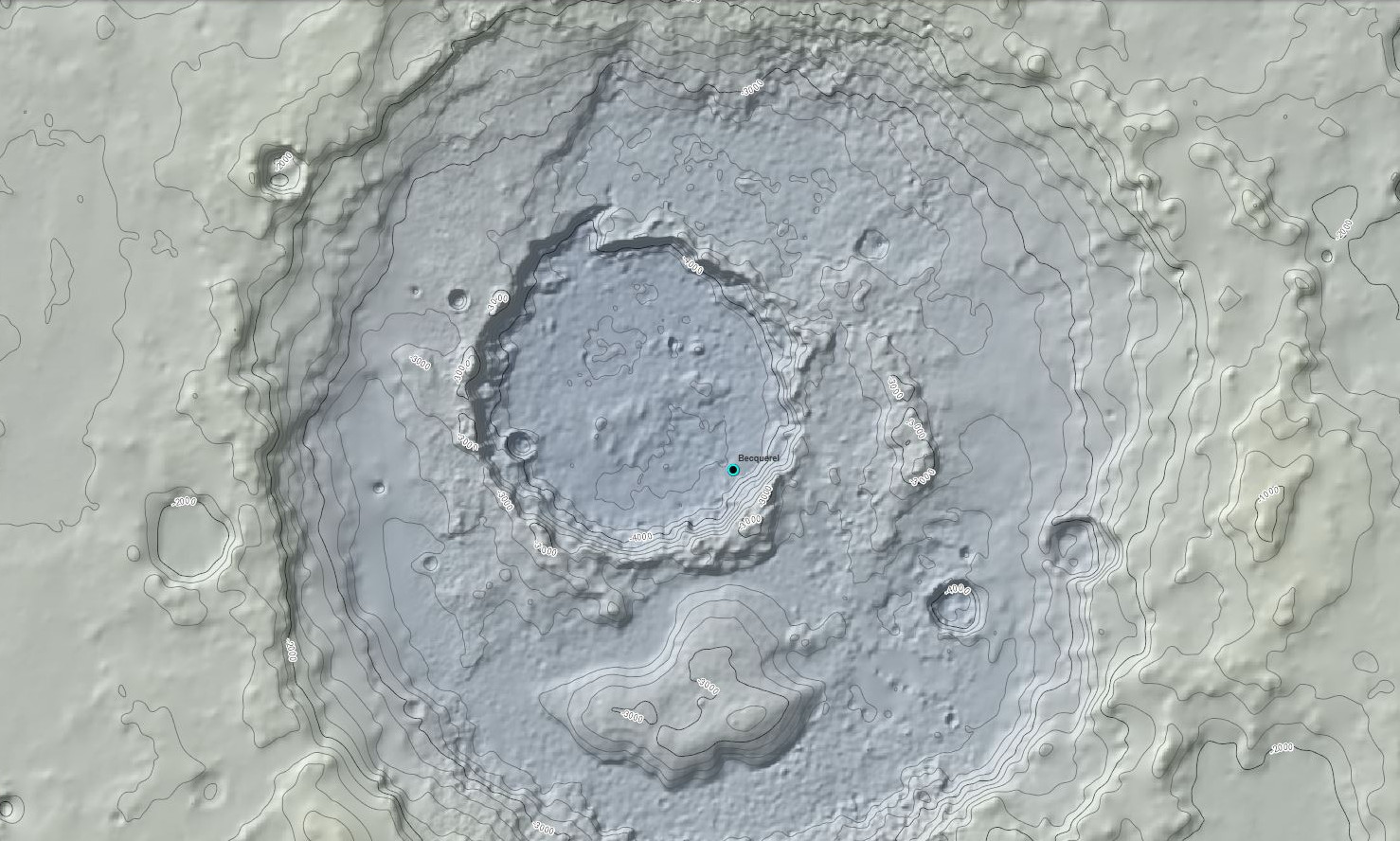
Becquerel crater is entirely below the areoid at approximately −2,200 meters at its highest point around the rim and approximately −4,300 meters at the bottom.

== See also ==
- Climate of Mars
- Groundwater on Mars
- Impact crater
- Impact event
- List of craters on Mars
- Ore resources on Mars
- Planetary nomenclature
- Water on Mars
