= Henri Becquerel =

French physicist (1852–1908)

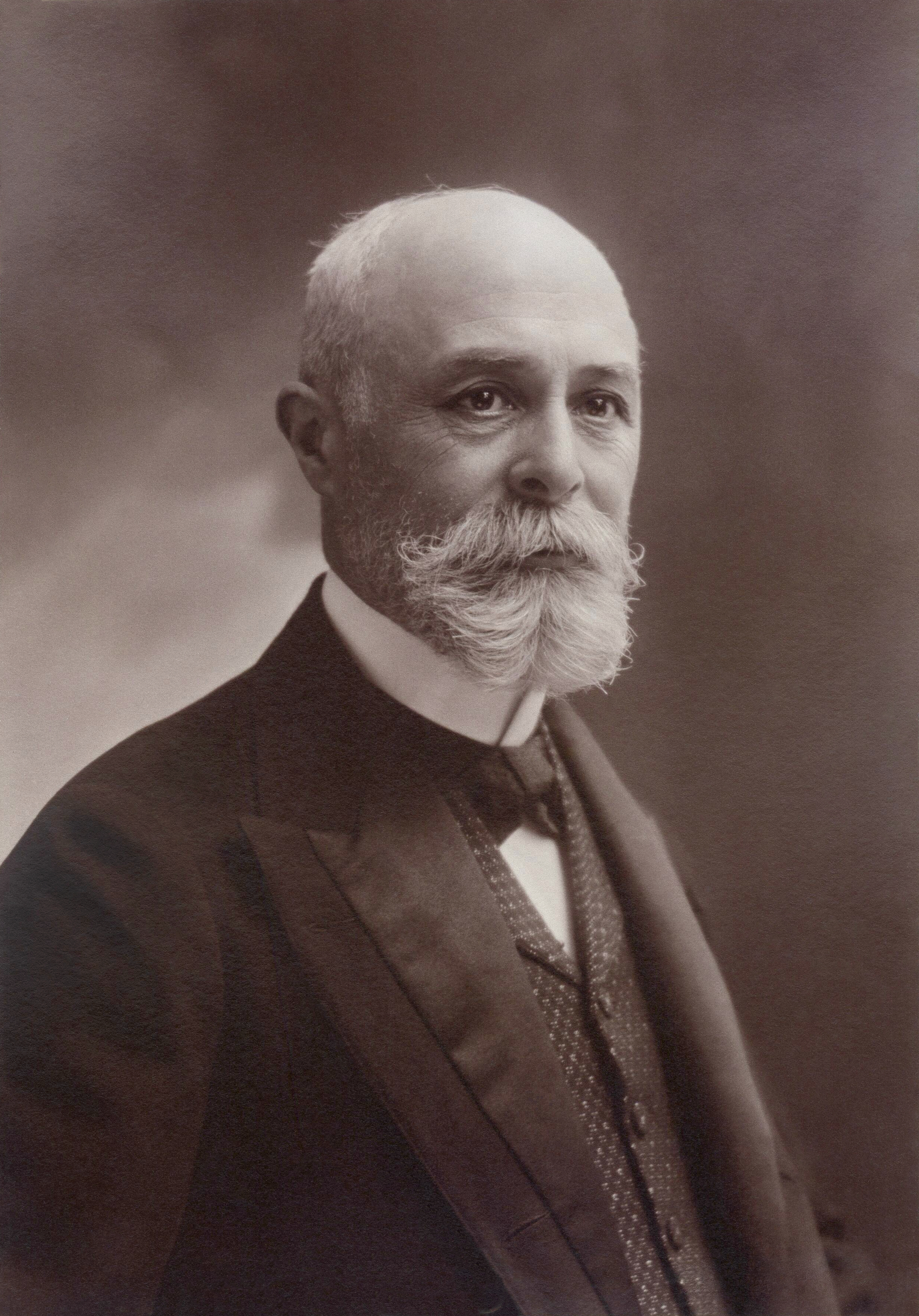
- Photograph of Becquerel by Paul Nadar
- Born: Antoine Henri Becquerel; 15 December 1852; Paris, France
- Died: 25 August 1908 (aged 55); Le Croisic, France
- Education: École polytechnique École des ponts et chaussées: Dipl.Ing., Civil Engineering; University of Paris: Dr ès sc., Physics
- Known for: Discovery of radioactivity
- Spouses: Lucie Zoë-Marie Jamin (m. 1877; died 1878) Louise Désirée Lorieux (m. 1890)
- Children: Jean Becquerel
- Father: Edmond Becquerel
- Family: Becquerel
- Awards: Rumford Medal (1900); Nobel Prize in Physics (1903)
- Scientific career
- Fields: Physics
- Workplaces: National Museum of Natural History; École polytechnique
- Thesis: Recherches sur l’absorption de la lumière dans les cristaux (1888)
- Doctoral advisor: Charles Friedel

Antoine Henri Becquerel (Note: /ˌbɛkəˈrɛl/ bek-uh-REL; French: [ɑ̃twan ɑ̃ʁi bɛkʁɛl]) (15 December 1852 – 25 August 1908) was a French experimental physicist who shared the 1903 Nobel Prize in Physics with Marie and Pierre Curie for his discovery of radioactivity. He also identified that beta particles are high-speed electrons, made observations that laid the groundwork for Ernest Rutherford's theory of radioactive transmutation, and noted the physiological effects of radioactivity which sparked medical applications as radiotherapy.

== Biography ==
Antoine Henri Becquerel was born on 15 December 1852 in Paris, France. He came from a scientifically talented family; his grandfather, Antoine César Becquerel, his father, Edmond Becquerel, and later his son, Jean Becquerel, were all notable physicists.

In 1872, Becquerel entered École polytechnique, and then went to École des ponts et chaussées in 1874. He became an engineer in 1877, and was promoted to chief engineer in the Department of Bridges and Highways in 1894. In 1878, he became an assistant at the National Museum of Natural History, where he was appointed Professor of Applied Physics in 1892. He also became a professor at École polytechnique in 1895.

In the early 1880s, Becquerel began researching luminescence. He studied the spectra produced by luminescent materials, and examined the absorption of light by crystals. He was especially interested in the influence of polarisation on luminescence. In 1888, he received a doctorate from the University of Paris on the basis of this work.

In 1877, Becquerel married Lucie Zoë-Marie Jamin (1854–1878), with whom he had a son, Jean, who was born the following year. In 1890, twelve years after his wife's death, he married Louise Désirée Lorieux.

== Discovery of radioactivity ==
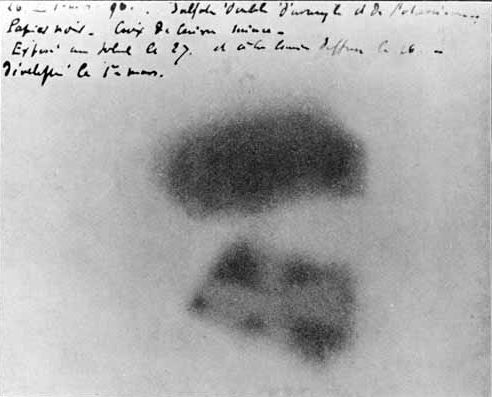
Image of Becquerel's photographic plate which has been fogged by exposure to radiation from a uranium salt. The shadow of a metal Maltese Cross placed between the plate and the uranium salt is clearly visible.

Becquerel's discovery of spontaneous radioactivity is a famous example of serendipity. Becquerel had long been interested in phosphorescence, the emission of light of one colour following the object's exposure to light of another colour. In early 1896, there was a wave of excitement following Wilhelm Röntgen's discovery of X-rays in late 1895. During the experiment, Röntgen "found that the Crookes tubes he had been using to study cathode rays emitted a new kind of invisible ray that was capable of penetrating through black paper." Becquerel learned of Röntgen's discovery during a meeting of the French Academy of Sciences on 20 January where his colleague Henri Poincaré read out Röntgen's preprint paper. Becquerel "began looking for a connection between the phosphorescence he had already been investigating and the newly discovered X-rays" of Röntgen, and thought that phosphorescent materials might emit penetrating X-ray-like radiation when illuminated by bright sunlight; he had various phosphorescent materials including some uranium salts for his experiments.

Throughout the first weeks of February, Becquerel layered photographic plates with coins or other objects then wrapped this in thick black paper, placed phosphorescent materials on top, placed these in bright sun light for several hours. The developed plate showed shadows of the objects. Already on 24 February he reported his first results. However, the 26 and 27 February were dark and overcast during the day, so Becquerel left his layered plates in a dark cabinet for these days. He nevertheless proceeded to develop the plates on 1 March and then made his astonishing discovery: the object shadows were just as distinct when left in the dark as when exposed to sunlight. Both William Crookes and Becquerel's 18-year-old son, Jean, witnessed the discovery.

By May 1896, after other experiments involving non-phosphorescent uranium salts, Becquerel arrived at the correct explanation, namely that the penetrating radiation came from the uranium itself, without any need for excitation by an external energy source. There followed a period of intense research into radioactivity, including the determination that the element thorium is also radioactive and the discovery of additional radioactive elements polonium and radium by Marie Curie and her husband, Pierre Curie. The intensive research of radioactivity led to Becquerel publishing seven papers on the subject in 1896. Becquerel's other experiments allowed him to research more into radioactivity and figure out different aspects of the magnetic field when radiation is introduced into the magnetic field. "When different radioactive substances were put in the magnetic field, they deflected in different directions or not at all, showing that there were three classes of radioactivity: negative, positive, and electrically neutral."

As simultaneity often happens in science, radioactivity came close to being discovered nearly four decades earlier in 1857, when Abel Niépce de Saint-Victor, who was investigating photography under Michel Eugène Chevreul, observed that uranium salts emitted radiation that could darken photographic emulsions. By 1861, Niepce de Saint-Victor realized that uranium salts produce "a radiation that is invisible to our eyes". Niepce de Saint-Victor knew Edmond Becquerel, Henri Becquerel's father. In 1868, Edmond Becquerel published a book, La lumière: ses causes et ses effets (Light: Its causes and its effects). On page 50 of volume 2, Edmond noted that Niepce de Saint-Victor had observed that some objects that had been exposed to sunlight could expose photographic plates even in the dark. Niepce further noted that on the one hand, the effect was diminished if an obstruction were placed between a photographic plate and the object that had been exposed to the sun, but " … d'un autre côté, l'augmentation d'effet quand la surface insolée est couverte de substances facilement altérables à la lumière, comme le nitrate d'urane … " ( ... on the other hand, the increase in the effect when the surface exposed to the sun is covered with substances that are easily altered by light, such as uranium nitrate ... ).

=== Experiments ===
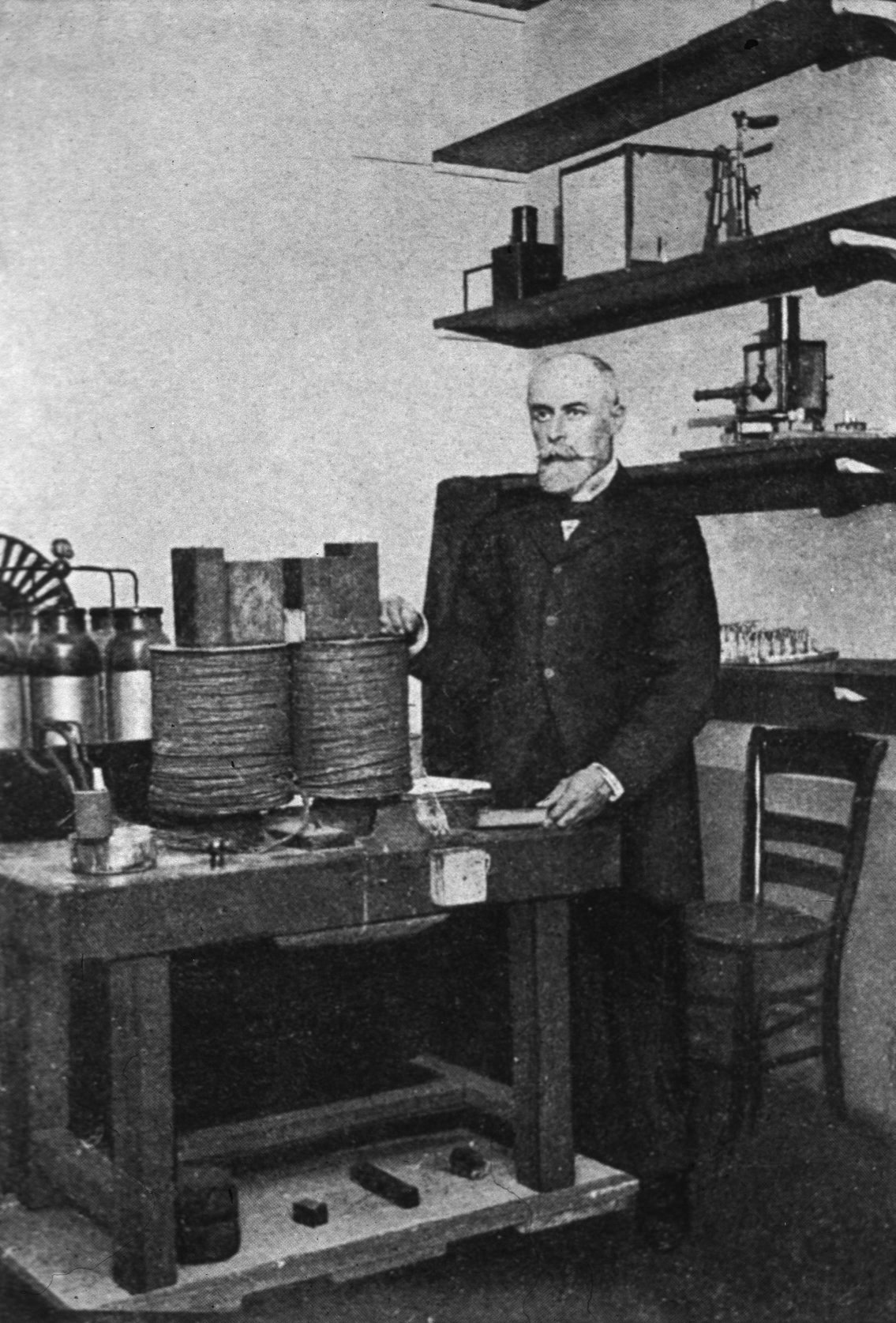
Becquerel in the lab.

Describing them to the French Academy of Sciences on 27 February 1896, he said:

One wraps a Lumière photographic plate with a bromide emulsion in two sheets of very thick black paper, such that the plate does not become clouded upon being exposed to the sun for a day. One places on the sheet of paper, on the outside, a slab of the phosphorescent substance, and one exposes the whole to the sun for several hours. When one then develops the photographic plate, one recognizes that the silhouette of the phosphorescent substance appears in black on the negative. If one places between the phosphorescent substance and the paper a piece of money or a metal screen pierced with a cut-out design, one sees the image of these objects appear on the negative ... One must conclude from these experiments that the phosphorescent substance in question emits rays which pass through the opaque paper and reduce silver salts.

But further experiments led him to doubt and then abandon this hypothesis. On 2 March 1896 he reported:

I will insist particularly upon the following fact, which seems to me quite important and beyond the phenomena which one could expect to observe: The same crystalline crusts [of potassium uranyl sulfate], arranged the same way with respect to the photographic plates, in the same conditions and through the same screens, but sheltered from the excitation of incident rays and kept in darkness, still produce the same photographic images. Here is how I was led to make this observation: among the preceding experiments, some had been prepared on Wednesday the 26th and Thursday the 27th of February, and since the sun was out only intermittently on these days, I kept the apparatuses prepared and returned the cases to the darkness of a bureau drawer, leaving in place the crusts of the uranium salt. Since the sun did not come out in the following days, I developed the photographic plates on the 1st of March, expecting to find the images very weak. Instead the silhouettes appeared with great intensity ... One hypothesis which presents itself to the mind naturally enough would be to suppose that these rays, whose effects have a great similarity to the effects produced by the rays studied by M. Lenard and M. Röntgen, are invisible rays emitted by phosphorescence and persisting infinitely longer than the duration of the luminous rays emitted by these bodies. However, the present experiments, without being contrary to this hypothesis, do not warrant this conclusion. I hope that the experiments which I am pursuing at the moment will be able to bring some clarification to this new class of phenomena.

== Later life and death ==
In 1900, Becquerel measured the properties of beta particles, and he realized that they had the same measurements as high speed electrons leaving the nucleus. The following year, he discovered that uranium X (now known to be thorium-234, first isolated as the 'active' part of uranium by Sir William Crookes in 1900) lost its radioactivity while the seemingly 'inactive' pure uranium (uranium-238) regained its radioactivity, leading to Ernest Rutherford and Frederick Soddy's discovery of radioactive equilibrium by way of transformation (disintegration) theory. That same year, he discovered that radioactivity could be used for medicine; he left a piece of radium in his vest pocket, and noticed that he had been burnt by it. This discovery led to the development of radiotherapy, which is now used to treat cancer.

Becquerel died on 25 August 1908 in Le Croisic at the age of 55. He died of a heart attack, but it was reported that "he had developed serious burns on his skin, likely from the handling of radioactive materials."

== Recognition ==
=== Honours ===
Year	Country	Honour	Ref.
1882	France	Knight of the Legion of Honour	
1900	France	Officer of the Legion of Honour	

=== Memberships ===
Year	Organisation	Type	Ref.
1889	French Academy of Sciences	Member	
1902	American Philosophical Society	International Member	
1908	Royal Society	Foreign Member	

=== Awards ===
Year	Organisation	Award	Co-recipients	Citation	Ref.
1900	Royal Society	Rumford Medal	—	"For his discoveries in radiation proceding [sic] from uranium."	
1903	Royal Swedish Academy of Sciences	Nobel Prize in Physics	Marie Curie and Pierre Curie	"In recognition of the extraordinary services he has rendered by his discovery of spontaneous radioactivity."	

== Commemoration ==
The SI unit of radioactivity is named after Becquerel. A crater on the Moon, as well as a crater on Mars, are named after him. Becquerelite, a uranium mineral, is named after him. Minor planet 6914 Becquerel is named in his honour.
