= Antoine César Becquerel =

French scientist (1788–1878)

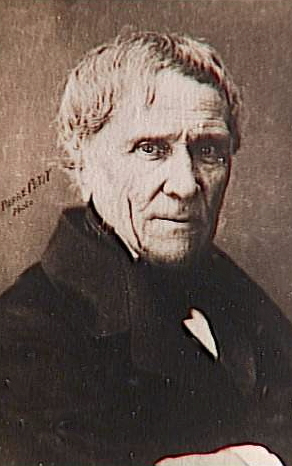
- Born: 7 March 1788; Châtillon-Coligny, Loiret, France
- Died: 18 January 1878 (aged 89); Paris
- Education: École Polytechnique
- Known for: Differential Galvanometer
- Awards: Copley Medal
- Scientific career
- Fields: Electricity, Electrochemistry
- Workplaces: École Polytechnique; Muséum National d'Histoire Naturelle

Notes
- Note that he is the father of A. E. Becquerel, and the grandfather of Henri Becquerel.

Antoine César Becquerel (French pronunciation: [ɑ̃twan sezaʁ bɛkʁɛl]; 7 March 1788 – 18 January 1878) was a French scientist and a pioneer in the study of electric and luminescent phenomena.

== Life ==
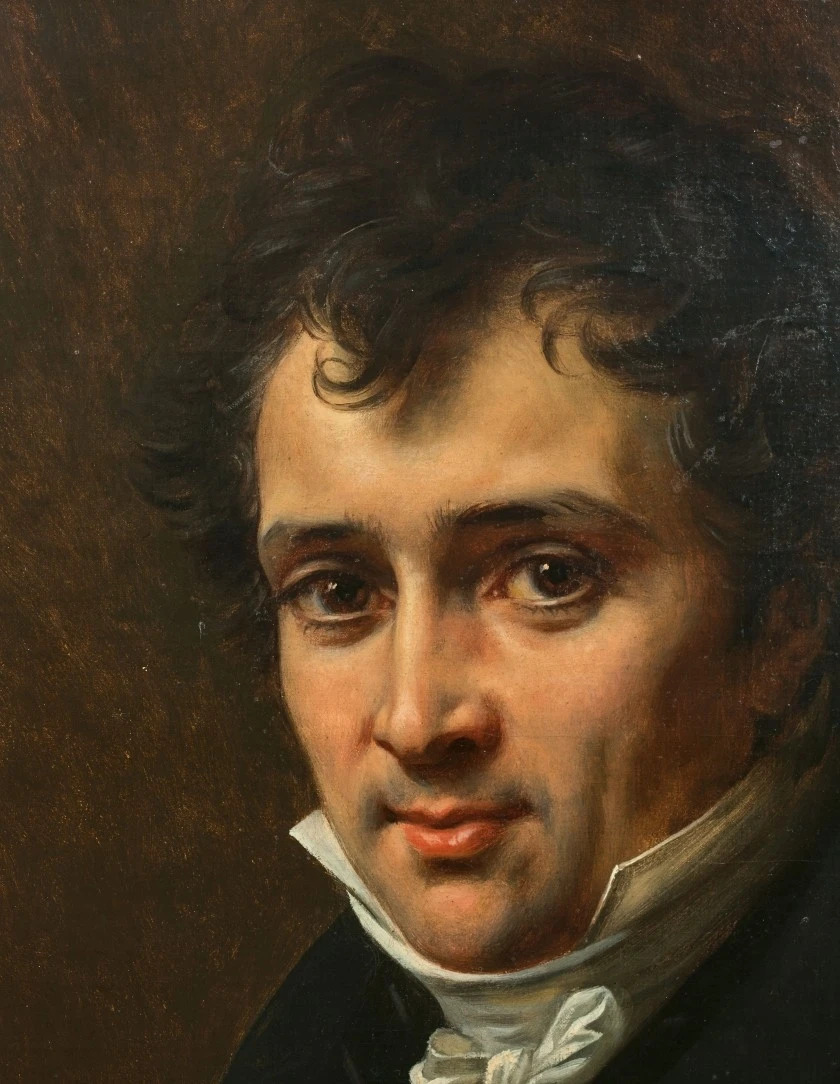
Portrait of Antoine César Becquerel by Antoine-Jean Gros (before 1835)

He was born at Châtillon-sur-Loing (today Châtillon-Coligny). After passing through the École polytechnique he became engineer-officer in 1808, and saw active service with the imperial troops in Spain from 1810 to 1812, and again in France in 1814. He then resigned from the army and devoted the rest of his life to scientific investigation.

In 1820, following the work of René Just Haüy, he found that pressure can induce electricity in every material, attributing the effect to surface interactions (this is not piezoelectricity). He was observing static electricity. In 1825 he invented a differential galvanometer for the accurate measurement of electrical resistance. In 1829 he invented a constant-current electrochemical cell, the forerunner of the Daniell cell. In 1839, working with his son A. E. Becquerel, he discovered the photovoltaic effect on an electrode immersed in a conductive liquid.

His earliest work was mineralogical in character, but he soon turned his attention to the study of electricity and especially of electrochemistry. In 1837 he became a Fellow of the Royal Society, and received its Copley Medal for his various memoirs on electricity, and particularly for those on the production of metallic sulphurets and sulphur by electrolysis. He was the first to prepare metallic elements from their ores by this method. It was hoped that this would lead to increased knowledge of the recomposition of crystallized bodies, and the processes which may have been employed by nature in the production of such bodies in the mineral kingdom.

In biochemistry he worked at the problems of animal heat and at the phenomena accompanying the growth of plants, and he also devoted much time to meteorological questions and observations. He was a prolific writer. He died in Paris, where from 1837 he had been professor of physics at the Museum d'Histoire Naturelle.

He became a correspondent of the Royal Institute in 1836; when that became the Royal Netherlands Academy of Arts and Sciences in 1851, he became a foreign member.

He was the father of the physicist A. E. Becquerel and grandfather of the physicist Henri Becquerel after whom the SI unit for radioactivity, the becquerel (Bq), is named.

His surname is one of the 72 names inscribed on the Eiffel Tower.

== Works ==
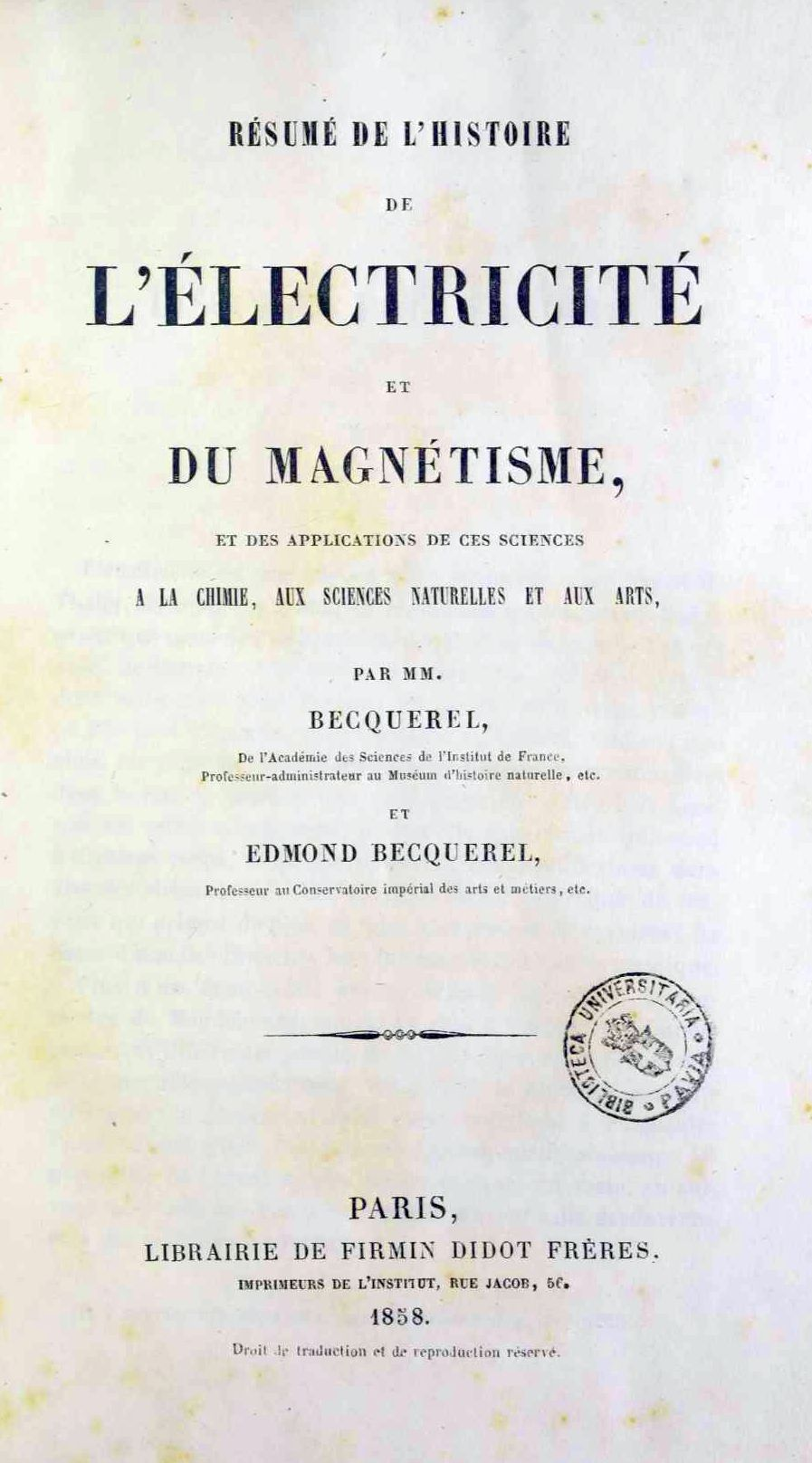
Résumé de l'historie de l'électricité et du magnétisme, et des applications de ces sciences a la chimie, aux sciences naturelles et aux arts, 1858

- Traité de l'électricité et du magnétisme, 7 volumes, 1834-1840. Vol. 2, vol. 5.
- Éléments de physique terrestre et de météorologie, 1841.
- Traité de physique considérée dans ses rapports avec la chimie et les sciences naturelles, 2 volumes, 1842.
- Éléments d'électro-chimie appliquée aux sciences naturelles et aux arts, 1843.
  - Éléments d'électro-chimie appliquée aux sciences naturelles et aux arts. Paris: Firmin-Didot. 1864.
- Traité complet du magnétisme, 1846.
- Traité de physique appliquée à la chimie et aux sciences naturelles, 2 volumes, 1847.
- Des climats et de l'influence qu'exercent les sols boisés et non boisés. Paris: Firmin-Didot. 1853.
- Traité d'électricité et de magnétisme, leurs applications aux sciences physiques, aux arts et à l'industrie, 3 volumes, 1855-1856.
  - Électricité. Vol. 1. Paris: Firmin-Didot. 1855.
  - Électro-chimie. Vol. 2. Paris: Firmin-Didot. 1855.
  - Magnétisme et électro-magnétisme. Vol. 3. Paris: Firmin-Didot. 1856.
- Résumé de l'historie de l'électricité et du magnétisme, et des applications de ces sciences a la chimie, aux sciences naturelles et aux arts. Paris: Firmin-Didot. 1858.
- Traité d'électrochimie, 1865.
- Des forces physico-chimiques et de leur intervention dans la production des phénomènes naturels. Paris: Firmin-Didot. 1875.

== See also ==
- List of works by Eugène Guillaume
- A. E. Becquerel (his son)
- Henri Becquerel, (his grandson)
- Jean Becquerel (his great-grandson)
