= Edmond Becquerel =

French physicist (1820–1891)

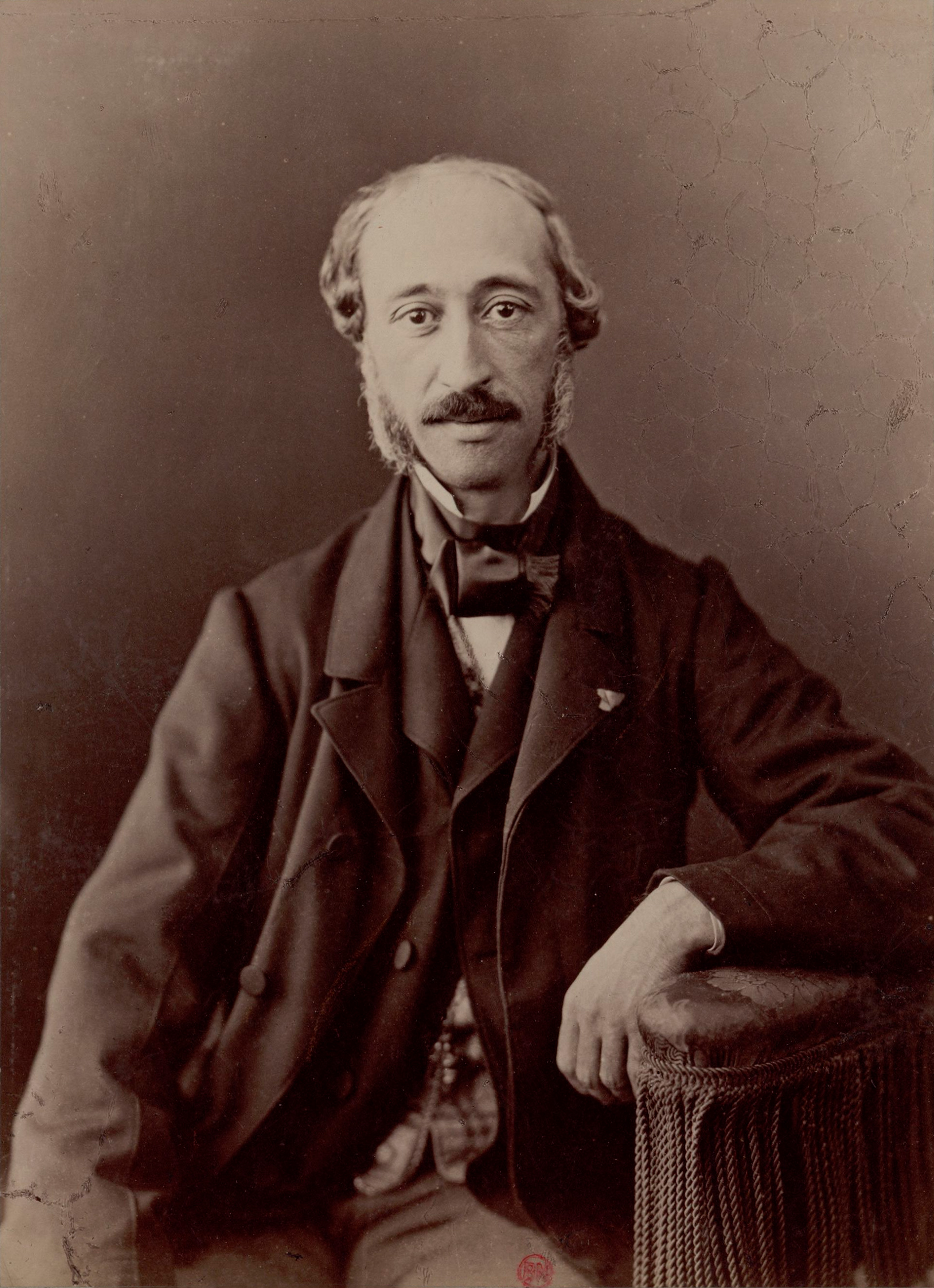
- Photograph of Becquerel by Nadar
- Born: Alexandre-Edmond Becquerel; 24 March 1820; Paris, Kingdom of France
- Died: 11 May 1891 (aged 71); Paris, French Republic
- Known for: Discovering the photovoltaic effect (1839); Discovering thermionic emission (1853)
- Children: Henri Becquerel
- Father: Antoine César Becquerel
- Scientific career
- Fields: Physics
- Workplaces: Conservatoire des arts et métiers (1853–1891); Muséum national d'histoire naturelle (until 1891)
- Thesis: Des effets chimiques et électriques produits sous l'influence de la lumière solaire (1840)

Alexandre-Edmond Becquerel (French: [alɛksɑ̃dʁ ɛdmɔ̃ bɛkʁɛl]; 24 March 1820 – 11 May 1891) was a French physicist who studied the solar spectrum, magnetism, electricity, and optics. In 1839, he discovered the photovoltaic effect, the operating principle of the solar cell, which he invented in the same year. He is also known for his work in luminescence and phosphorescence. He was the son of Antoine César Becquerel and the father of Henri Becquerel, the discoverer of radioactivity.

== Biography ==
Born in Paris, Becquerel was the pupil-turned-successor of his father at the Muséum national d'histoire naturelle. He was also appointed professor at the short-lived Agronomic Institute in Versailles in 1849, and in 1853, received the Chair of Physics at the Conservatoire des arts et métiers. He was associated with his father in much of his work.

== The first photovoltaic device ==
In 1839, at age 19, while experimenting in his father's laboratory, Becquerel created the world's first photovoltaic cell. In this experiment, he placed silver chloride in an acidic solution and illuminated it while it was connected to platinum electrodes, thus generating voltage and current. Because of this work, the photovoltaic effect has also been known as the "Becquerel effect".

== Photographic discoveries ==
Becquerel was an early experimenter in photography. In 1840, he discovered that the silver halides, natively insensitive to red and yellow light, became sensitive to that part of the spectrum in proportion to their exposure to blue, violet and ultraviolet light, allowing daguerreotypes and other photographic materials to be developed by bathing in strong red or yellow light rather than by chemical treatment. In practice this technique was rarely used. In 1848 he produced color photographs of the solar spectrum, and also of camera images, by a technique later found to be akin to the Lippmann interference method, but the camera exposures required were impractically long and the images could not be stabilized, their colors persisting only if kept in total darkness, however this work is based on discoveries of T. J. Seebeck prior to 1810.

== Other studies ==
Becquerel paid special attention to the study of light, investigating the photochemical effects and spectroscopic characters of solar radiation and the electric arc light, and the phenomena of phosphorescence, particularly as displayed by the sulfides and by compounds of uranium. It was in connection with these latter inquiries that he devised his phosphoroscope, an apparatus which enabled the interval between exposure to the source of light and observation of the resulting effects to be varied at will and accurately measured.

He investigated the diamagnetic and paramagnetic properties of substances and was keenly interested in the phenomena of electrochemical decomposition, accumulating much evidence in favor of Faraday's law of electrolysis and proposing a modified statement of it which was intended to cover certain apparent exceptions. In 1853, Becquerel discovered thermionic emission.

== Publications ==
In 1867 and 1868 Becquerel published La lumière, ses causes et ses effets (Light, its Causes and Effects), a two-volume treatise which became a standard text. His many papers, essays, and commentaries appeared in French scientific journals, mainly the French Academy of Sciences' widely distributed Comptes Rendus, from 1839 until shortly before his death in 1891.

== Honors and awards ==
Becquerel was elected a member of the Royal Swedish Academy of Sciences in 1886.

The Becquerel Prize for "outstanding merit in photovoltaics" is awarded annually at the European Photovoltaic Solar Energy Conference and Exhibition (EU PVSEC).

== See also ==
- Phosphoroscope
- Physical crystallography before X-rays
