= Viking 2 =

NASA space orbiter and lander sent to Mars

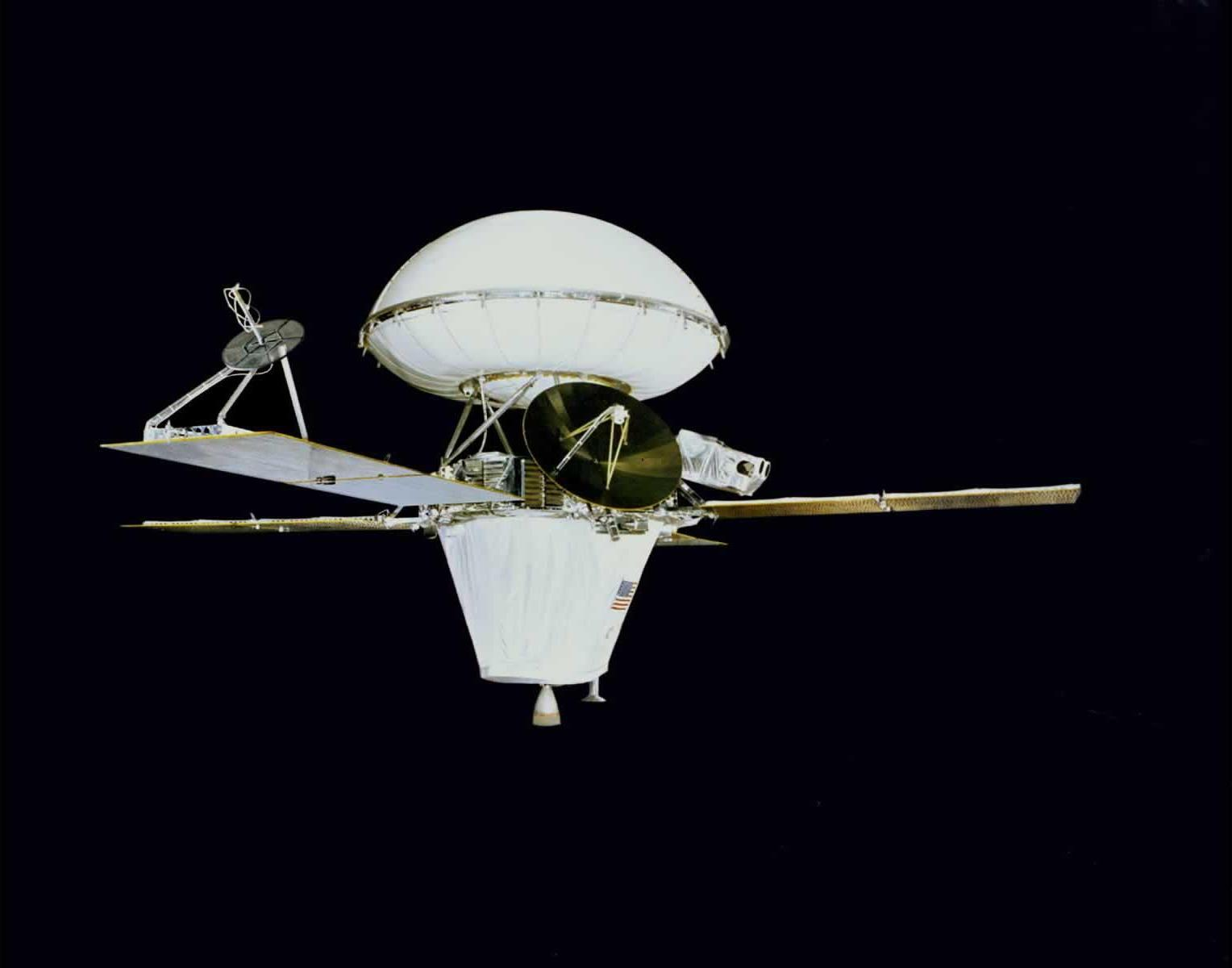
- Lander shell (top) and orbiter
- Mission type: Mars Orbiter/lander
- Operator: NASA
- COSPAR ID: Orbiter: 1975-083A; Lander: 1975-083C
- SATCAT no.: Orbiter: 8199; Lander: 9408
- Website: Viking Project Information
- Mission duration: Orbiter: 1050 days (1022 sol); Lander: 1316 days (1281 sol); Launch to last contact: 1,676 days

Spacecraft properties
- Manufacturer: Orbiter: JPL; Lander: Martin Marietta
- Launch mass: 3,530 kg (Note: "fully fueled orbiter-lander pair")
- Dry mass: Orbiter: 883 kg (1,947 lb); Lander: 572 kg (1,261 lb)
- Power: Orbiter: 620 W Lander: 70 W

Start of mission
- Launch date: 18:39, September 9, 1975 (UTC)
- Rocket: Titan IIIE
- Launch site: Cape Canaveral LC-41
- Contractor: Martin Marietta

End of mission
- Last contact: April 12, 1980

Orbital parameters
- Reference system: Areocentric
- Eccentricity: 0.81630
- Periareion altitude: 300 km (190 mi)
- Apoareion altitude: 33,176 km (20,615 mi)
- Inclination: 80.5°
- Period: 24.08 hours
- Epoch: July 24, 1980

Mars orbiter
- Spacecraft component: Viking 2 Orbiter
- Orbital insertion: August 7, 1976

Mars lander
- Spacecraft component: Viking 2 Lander
- Landing date: September 3, 1976; 22:37:50 UTC (MSD 36500 00:13 AMT)
- Landing site: 47.64°N 225.71°W
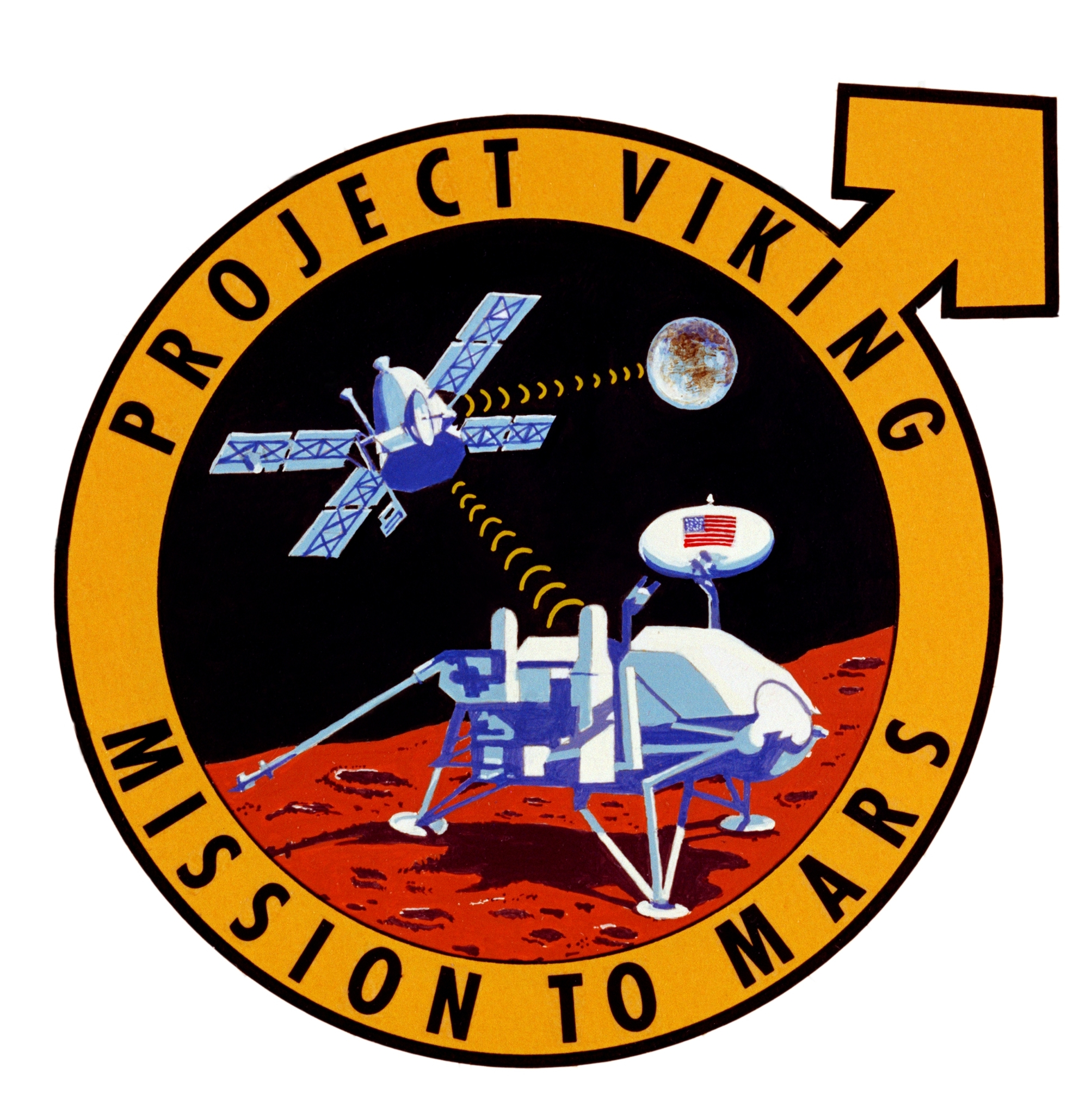
- Large Strategic Science Missions; Planetary Science Division Viking program

The Viking 2 mission is part of the American Viking program to Mars, and consisted of an orbiter and a lander essentially identical to that of the Viking 1 mission. Viking 2 was operational on Mars for 1281 sols (1,316 days; 3 years, 221 days). The Viking 2 lander operated on the surface for 1,316 days, or 1281 sols, and was turned off on April 12, 1980, when its batteries eventually failed. The orbiter worked until July 25, 1978, returning almost 16,000 images in 706 orbits around Mars.

== Mission profile ==
The craft was launched on September 9, 1975. Following launch using a Titan/Centaur launch vehicle and a 333-day cruise to Mars, the Viking 2 Orbiter began returning global images of Mars prior to orbit insertion. The orbiter was inserted into a 1,500 x 33,000 km, 24.6 h Mars orbit on August 7, 1976, and trimmed to a 27.3 h site certification orbit with a periapsis of 1,499 km and an inclination of 55.2 degrees on August 9. The orbiter then began taking photographs of candidate landing sites, which were used to select the final landing site.

The lander separated from the orbiter on September 3, 1976, at 22:37:50 UT and landed at Utopia Planitia. The normal procedure called for the structure connecting the orbiter and lander (the bioshield) to be ejected after separation. However, due to problems with the separation process, the bioshield remained attached to the orbiter. The orbit inclination was raised to 75 degrees on September 30, 1976.

=== Orbiter ===
The orbiter's primary mission ended on October 5, 1976, at the beginning of solar conjunction. The extended mission commenced on December 14, 1976, after the solar conjunction. On December 20, 1976, the periapsis was lowered to 778 km, and the inclination raised to 80 degrees.

Operations included close approaches to Deimos in October 1977, and the periapsis was lowered to 300 km and the period changed to 24 hours on October 23, 1977. The orbiter developed a leak in its propulsion system that vented its attitude control gas. It was placed in a 302 × 33,176 km orbit and turned off on July 25, 1978, after returning almost 16,000 images in about 700–706 orbits around Mars.

=== Lander ===
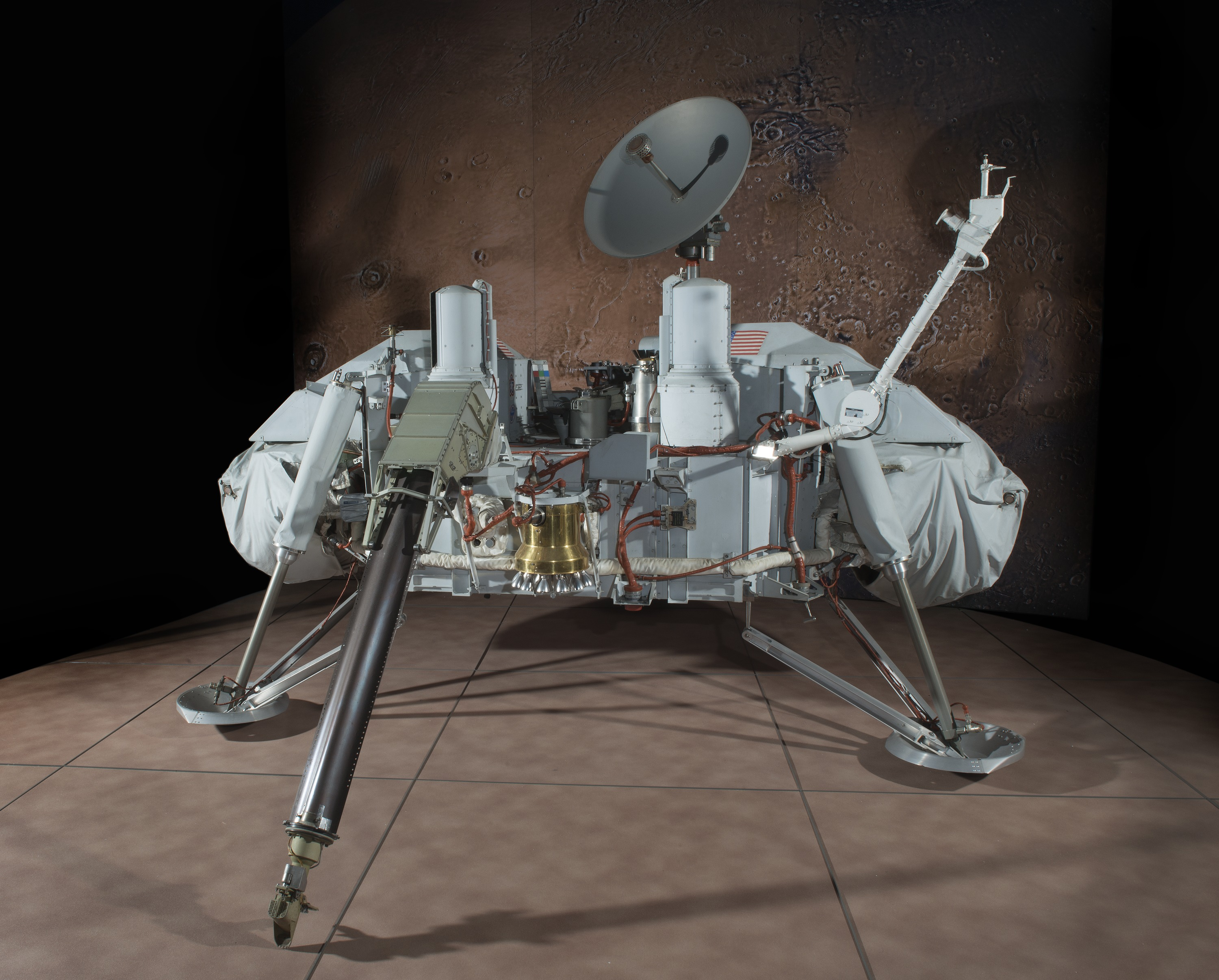
Proof test article of the Viking Mars Lander

The lander and its aeroshell separated from the orbiter on September 3, 1976, at 19:39:59 UT. At the time of separation, the lander was orbiting at about 4 km/s. After separation, rockets fired to begin lander deorbit. After a few hours, at about 300 km attitude, the lander was reoriented for entry. The aeroshell with its ablative heat shield slowed the craft as it plunged through the atmosphere.

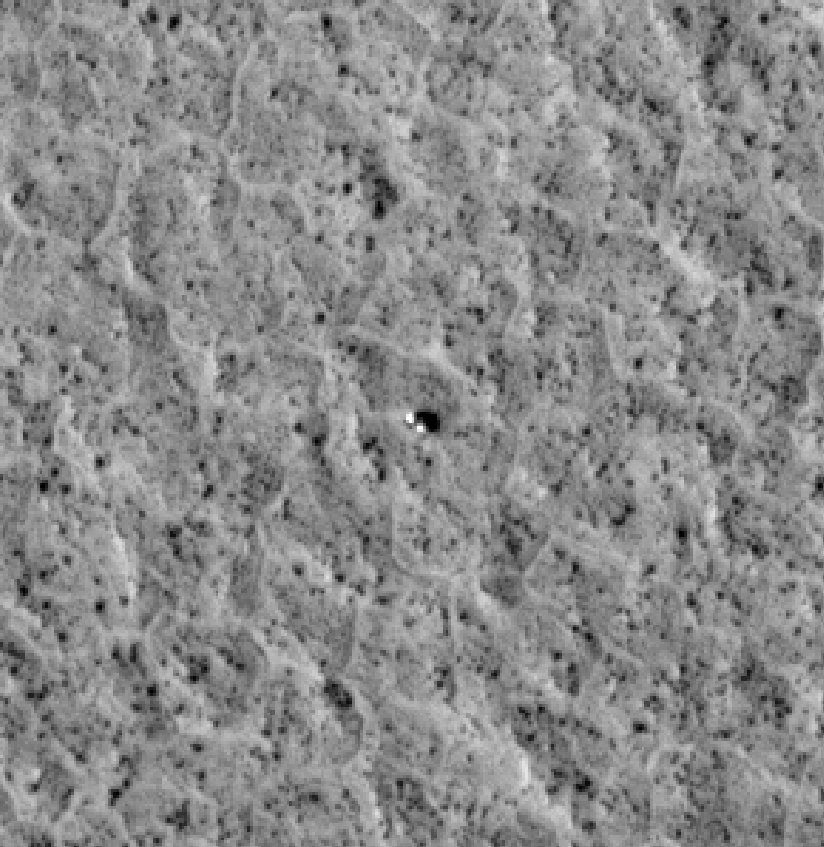
Photo of the Viking 2 lander taken by the Mars Reconnaissance Orbiter in 2006

The Viking 2 lander touched down about 200 km west of the crater Mie in Utopia Planitia at 48.269°N 225.990°W at an altitude of -4.23 km relative to a reference ellipsoid with an equatorial radius of 3,397.2 km and a flattening of 0.0105 (47.967°N 225.737°W planetographic longitude) at 22:58:20 UT (9:49:05 a.m. local Mars time).

Approximately 22 kg (49 lb) of propellants were left at landing. Due to radar misidentification of a rock or highly reflective surface, the thrusters fired an extra time 0.4 seconds before landing, cracking the surface and raising dust. The lander settled down with one leg on a rock, tilted at 8.2 degrees. The cameras began taking images immediately after landing.

The Viking 2 lander was powered by radioisotope generators and operated on the surface until its batteries failed on April 12, 1980.

In July 2001, the Viking 2 lander was renamed the Gerald Soffen Memorial Station after Gerald Soffen (1926–2000), the project scientist of the Viking program.

== Results from the Viking 2 mission ==
=== Landing site soil analysis ===
The regolith, referred to often as "soil", resembled those produced from the weathering of basaltic lavas. The tested soil contained abundant silicon and iron, along with significant amounts of magnesium, aluminum, sulfur, calcium, and titanium. Trace elements, strontium and yttrium, were detected.

The amount of potassium was one-fifth of the average for the Earth's crust. Some chemicals in the soil contained sulfur and chlorine that were like those remaining after the evaporation of seawater. Sulfur was more concentrated in the crust on top of the soil than in the bulk soil beneath.

The sulfur may be present as sulfates of sodium, magnesium, calcium, or iron. A sulfide of iron is also possible. The Spirit rover and the Opportunity rover both found sulfates on Mars.

Minerals typical weathering products of mafic igneous rocks were found. All samples heated in the gas chromatograph-mass spectrometer (GCMS) gave off water.

However, the way the samples were handled prohibited an exact measurement of the amount of water. But, it was around 1%. Studies with magnets aboard the landers indicated that the soil is between 3 and 7 percent magnetic materials by weight. The magnetic chemicals could be magnetite and maghemite, which could come from the weathering of basalt rock. Subsequent experiments carried out by the Mars Spirit rover (landed in 2004) suggest that magnetite could explain the magnetic nature of the dust and soil on Mars.

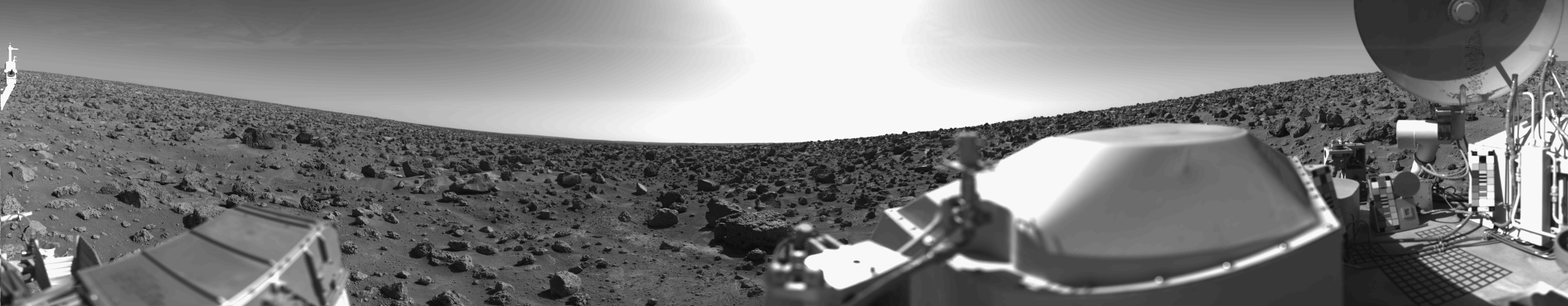
Viking 2 lander image of Utopia Planitia.

=== Search for life ===
Viking 2 carried a biology experiment whose purpose was to look for life. The Viking 2 biology experiment weighed 15.5 kg (34 lb) and consisted of three subsystems: the Pyrolytic Release experiment (PR), the Labeled Release experiment (LR), and the Gas Exchange experiment (GEX). In addition, independent of the biology experiments, Viking 2 carried a Gas Chromatograph/Mass Spectrometer (GCMS) that could measure the composition and abundance of organic compounds in the Martian soil.

The results were unusual and conflicting: the GCMS and GEX gave negative results, while the PR and LR gave positive results. Viking scientist Patricia Straat stated in 2009, "Our (LR) experiment was a definite positive response for life, but a lot of people have claimed that it was a false positive for a variety of reasons."

Many scientists believe that the data results were attributed to inorganic chemical reactions in the soil. However, this view may be changing due to a variety of discoveries and studies since Viking. These include the discovery of near-surface ice near the Viking landing zone, the possibility of perchlorate destruction of organic matter, and the reanalysis of GCMS data by scientists in 2018. Some scientists still believe the results were due to living reactions. The formal declaration at the time of the mission was that the discovery of organic chemicals was inconclusive.

Mars has almost no ozone layer, unlike the Earth, so UV light sterilizes the surface and produces highly reactive chemicals such as peroxides that would oxidize any organic chemicals. The Phoenix Lander discovered the chemical perchlorate in the Martian soil. Perchlorate is a powerful oxidizing agent, which could have eradicated any organic material on the surface. Perchlorate is now considered widespread on Mars, making it hard to detect any organic compounds on the Martian surface.

=== Viking 2 lander image gallery ===
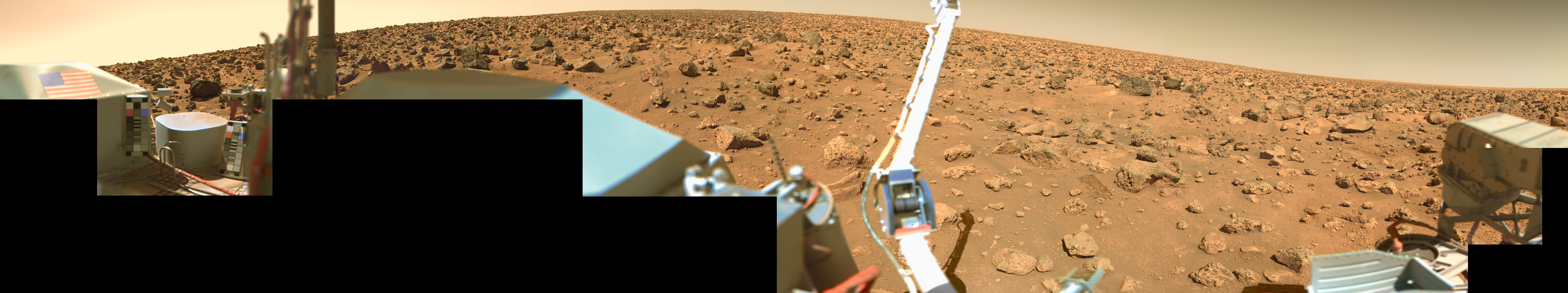
Viking 2 lander Camera 1 NOON HIGH RESOLUTION MOSAIC (With Low Resolution Color).
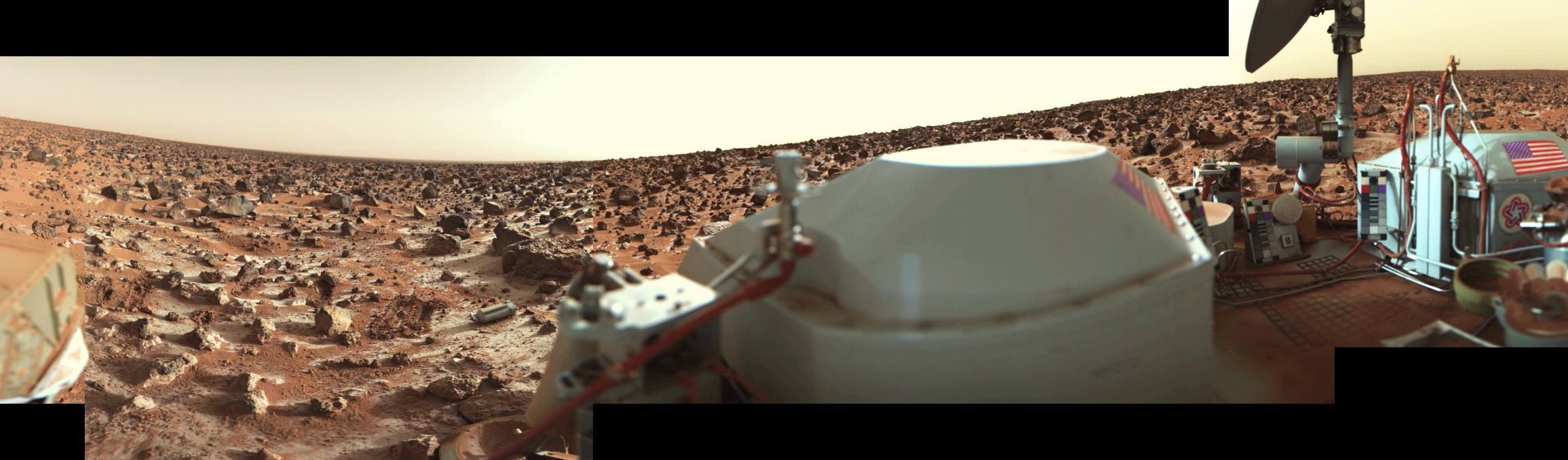
Viking 2 Lander Camera 2 FROST (Low Resolution Color) Sol 1028, 1030 and 1050 between 11:34 and 12:40.
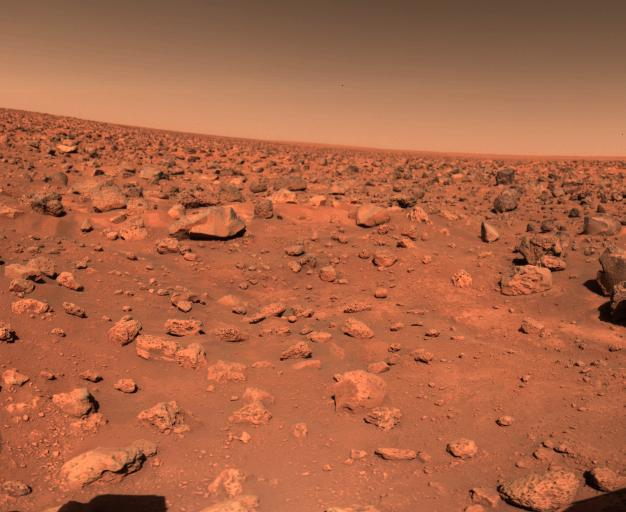
First color image (Viking 2 lander Camera 2 sol 2, September 5, 1976) 14:36

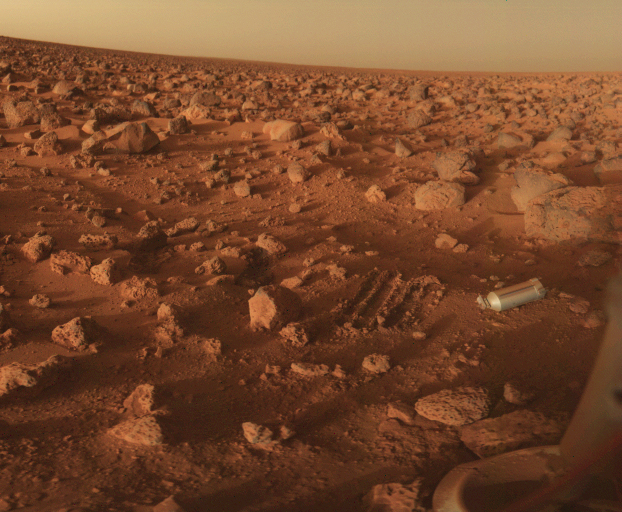
Viking 2 lander Camera 2 22G144 (Low Resolution Color) Sol 552 19:16

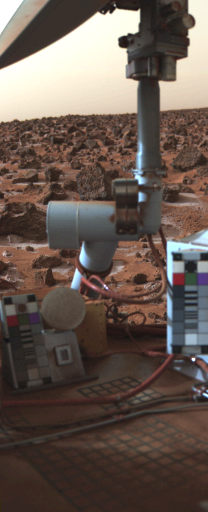
Frost on Mars.

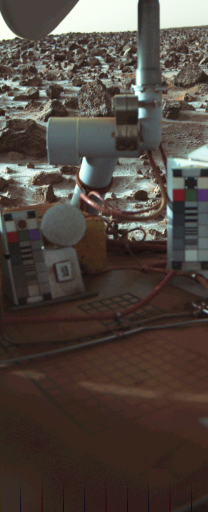
Viking 2 lander Camera 2 FROST (Low Resolution Color) Sol 955 12:13

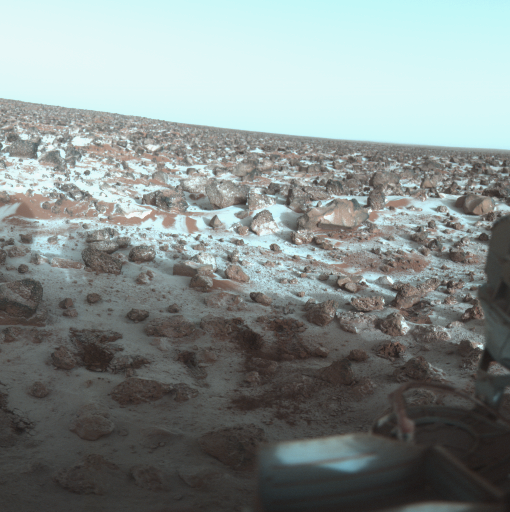
Frost at the landing site. (false color)

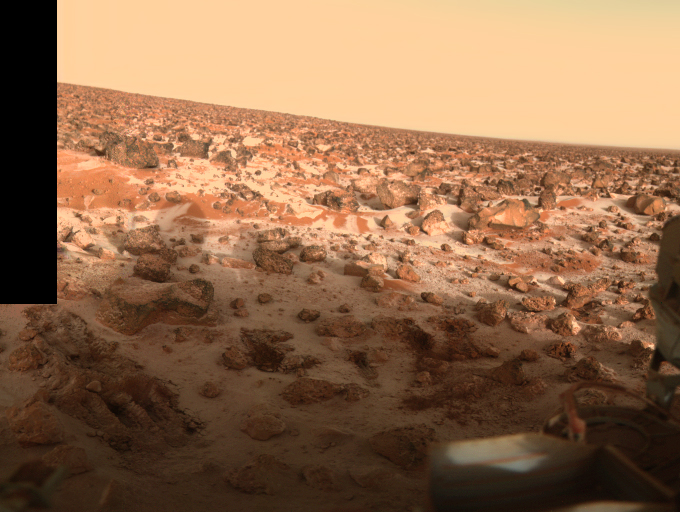
Viking 2 lander Camera 1 FROST (Low Resolution Color) Sol 960 14:14

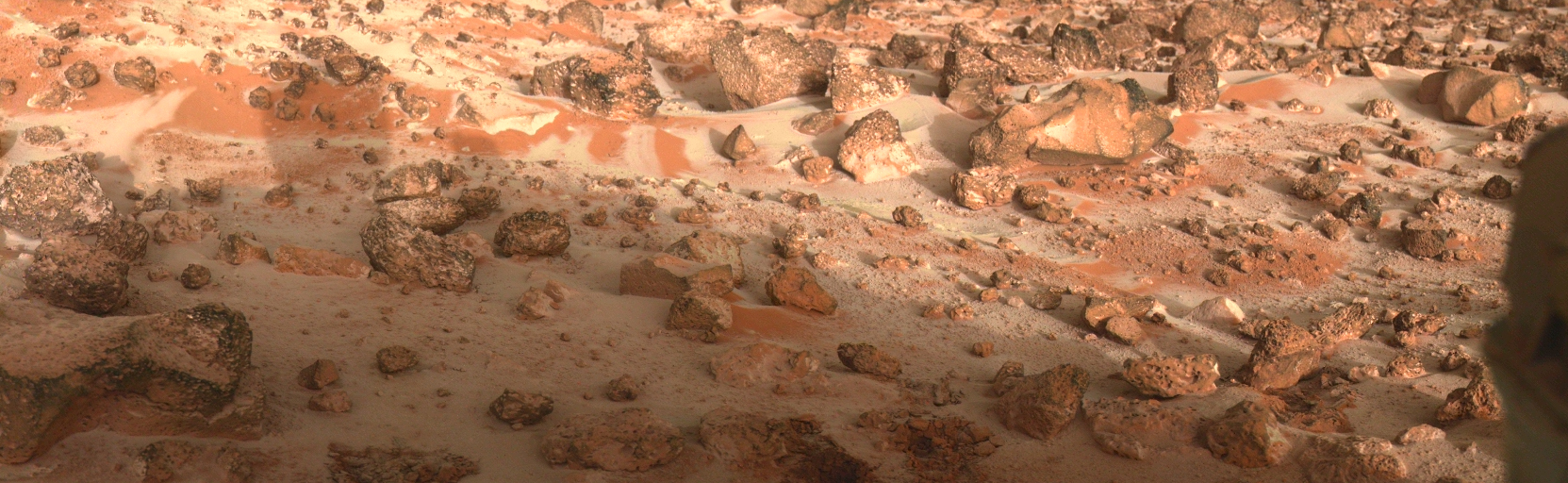
Viking 2 lander Camera 1 FROST HIGH RESOLUTION (With Low Resolution Color) Sol 959 14:39

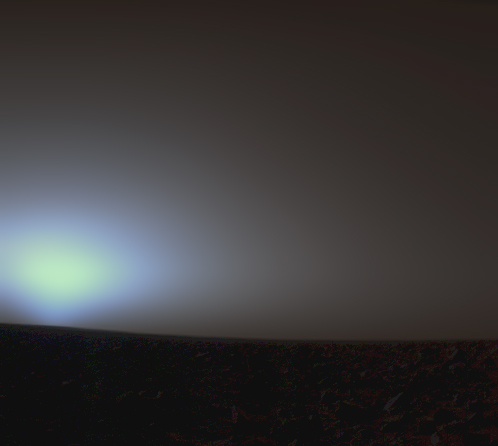
Viking 2 lander Camera 2 SKY AT SUNRISE (Low Resolution Color) Sol 34 04:22

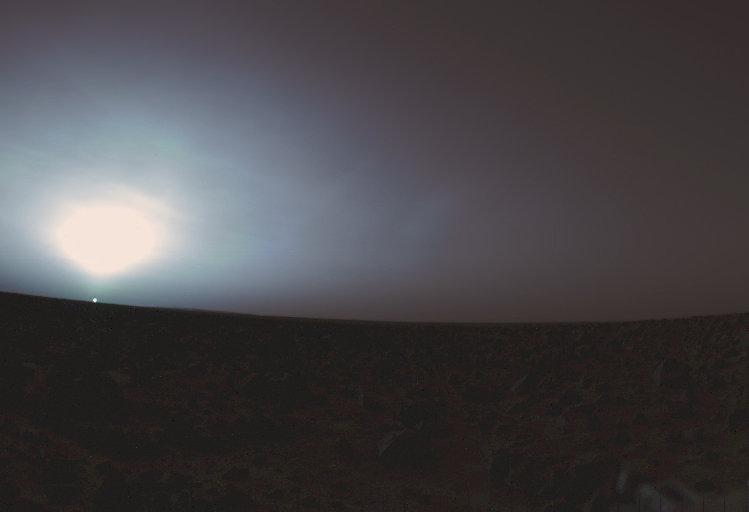
Viking 2 lander Camera 2 SKY AT SUNRISE (Low Resolution Color) Sol 631 04:00

== Orbiter results ==
=== Viking program ===
The Viking orbiters led to significant discoveries about the presence of water on Mars. Huge river valleys were found in many areas. They showed that water floods carved deep valleys, eroded grooves into bedrock, and traveled thousands of kilometers. In the southern hemisphere, the presence of branched stream areas suggests that there was once rainfall.

The images below are mosaics of many small, high-resolution images.

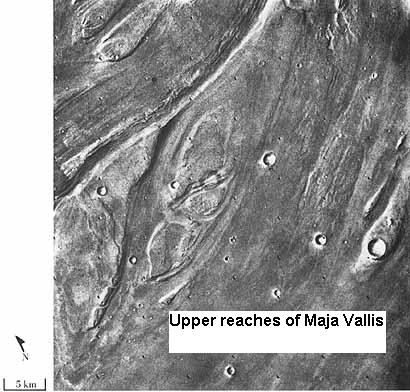
Streamlined islands seen by Viking showed that large floods occurred on Mars. Image is located in Lunae Palus quadrangle.

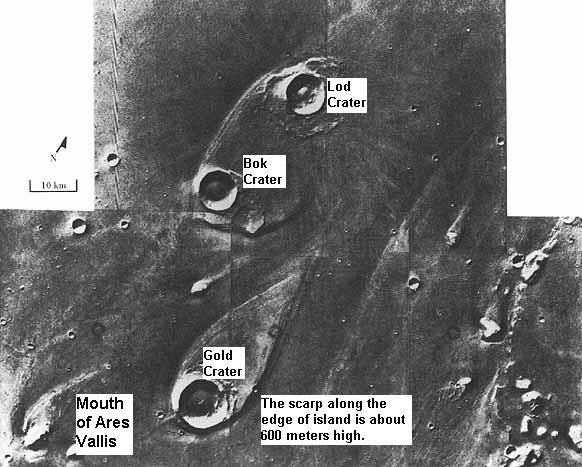
Tear-drop shaped islands caused by flood waters from Maja Valles, as seen by Viking Orbiter. Image is located in Oxia Palus quadrangle. The islands are formed in the ejecta of Lod, Bok, and Gold craters.

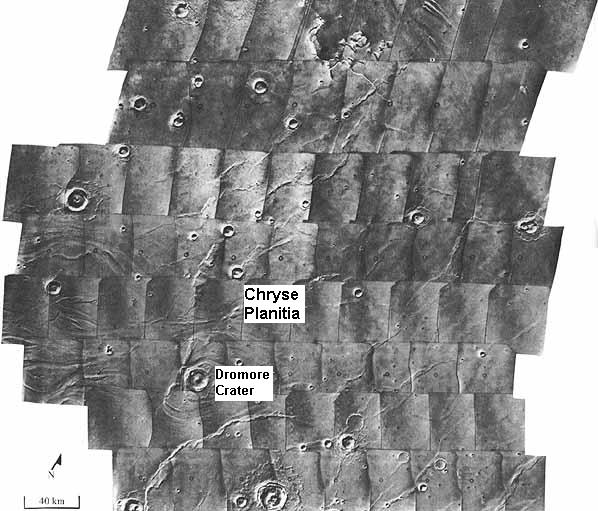
Scour patterns, located in Lunae Palus quadrangle, were produced by flowing water from Maja Valles, which lies just to the left of this mosaic. Detail of flow around Dromore crater is shown on the next image.

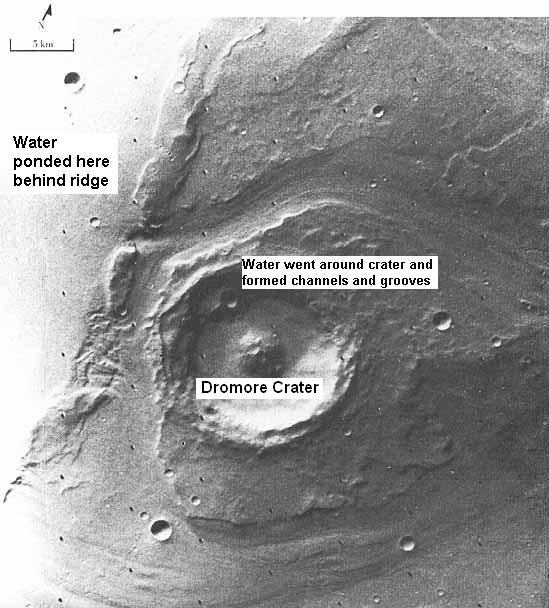
Great amounts of water were required to carry out the erosion shown in this Viking image. Image is located in Lunae Palus quadrangle. The erosion shaped the ejecta around Dromore.

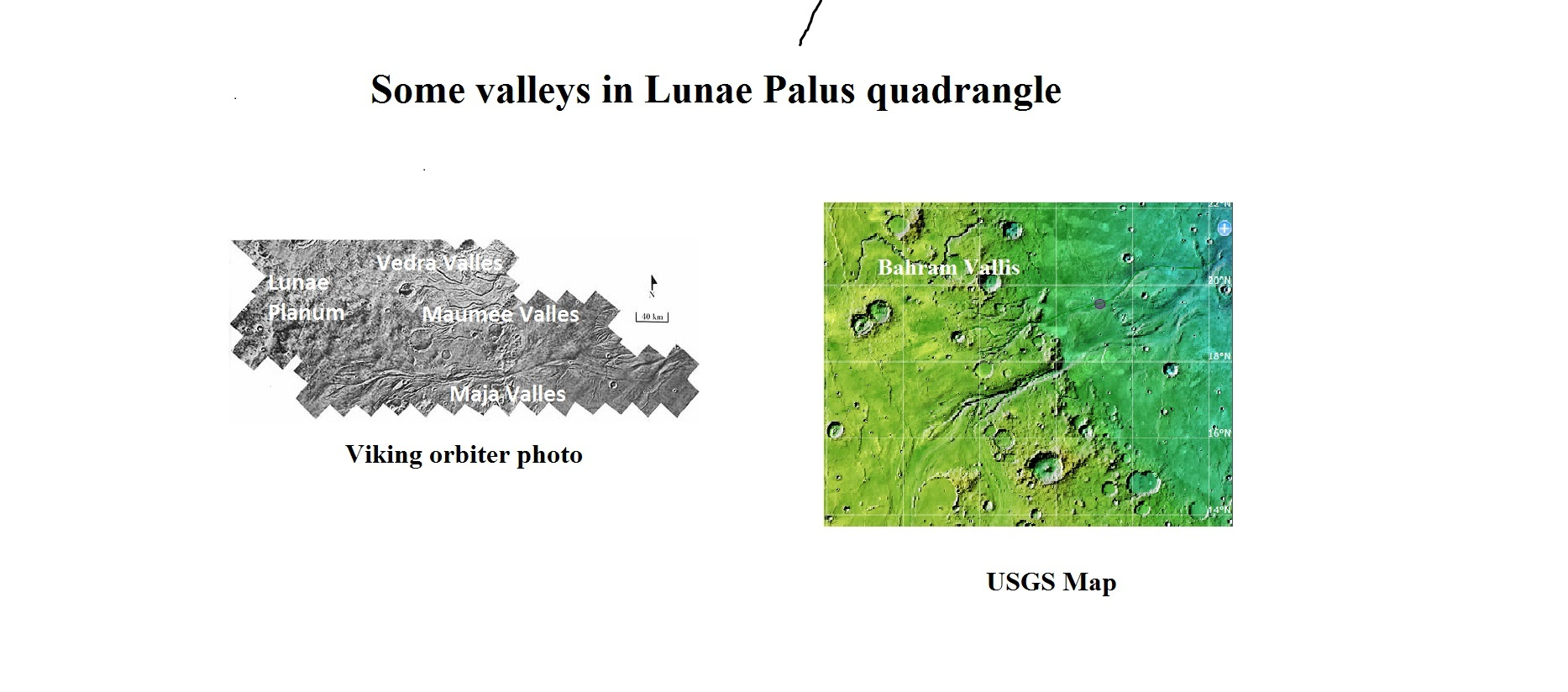
Waters from Vedra Valles, Maumee Valles, and Maja Valles flowed from Lunae Planum on the left, to Chryse Planitia on the right. Image is located in Lunae Palus quadrangle and was taken by Viking Orbiter.

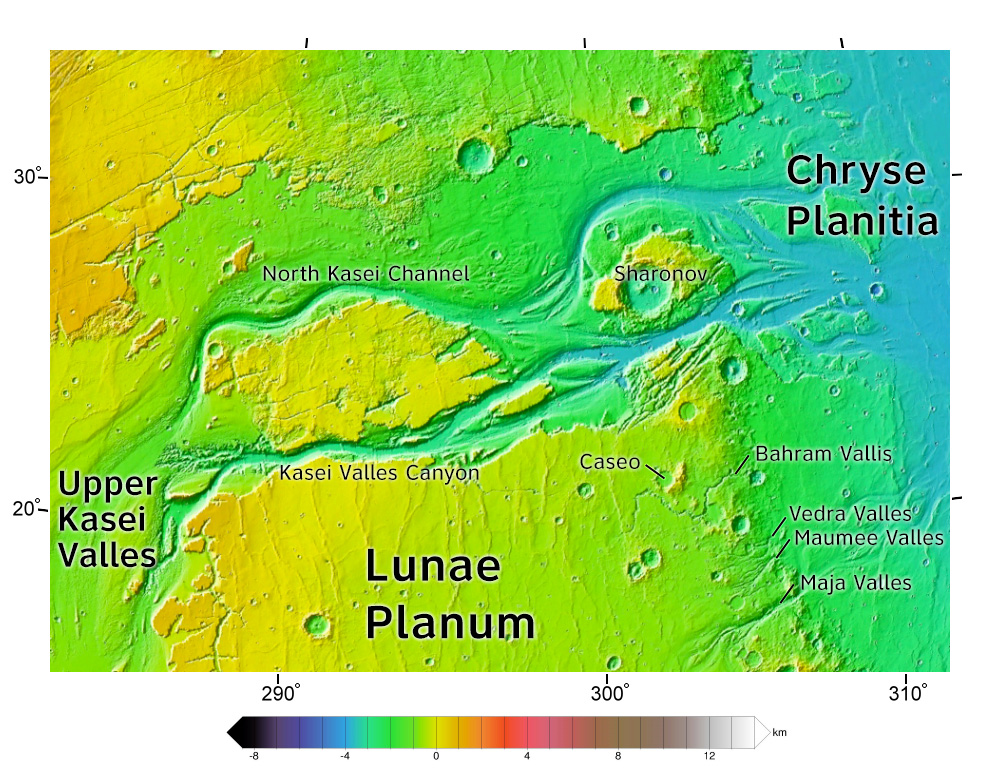
Area around northern Kasei Valles, showing relationships among Kasei Valles, Bahram Vallis, Vedra Valles, Maumee Valles, and Maja Valles. Map location is in Lunae Palus quadrangle and includes parts of Lunae Planum and Chryse Planitia.

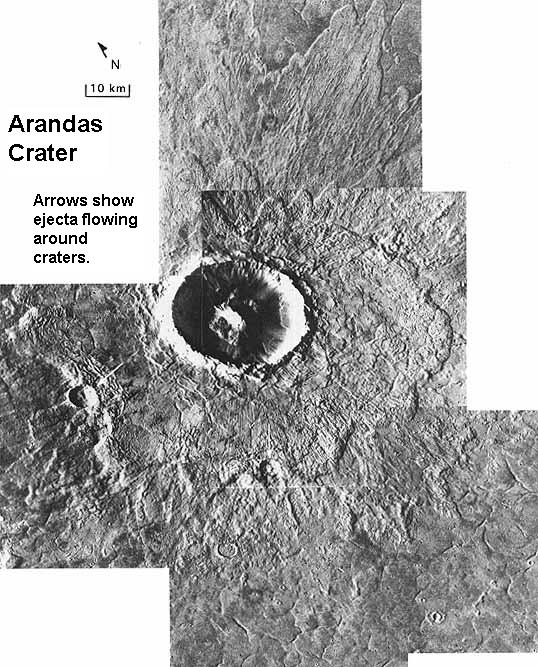
The ejecta from Arandas crater acts like mud. It moves around small craters (indicated by arrows), instead of just falling down on them. Craters like this suggest that large amounts of frozen water were melted when the impact crater was produced. Image is located in Mare Acidalium quadrangle and was taken by Viking Orbiter.

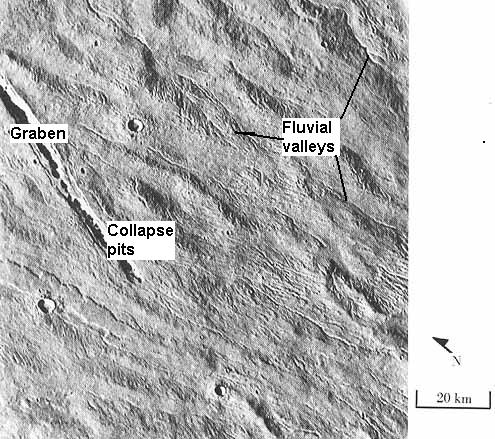
This view of the flank of Alba Patera shows several channels/troughs. Some channels are associated with lava flows; others are probably caused by running water. A large trough or graben turns into a line of collapse pits. Image is located in Arcadia quadrangle and was taken by Viking Orbiter.

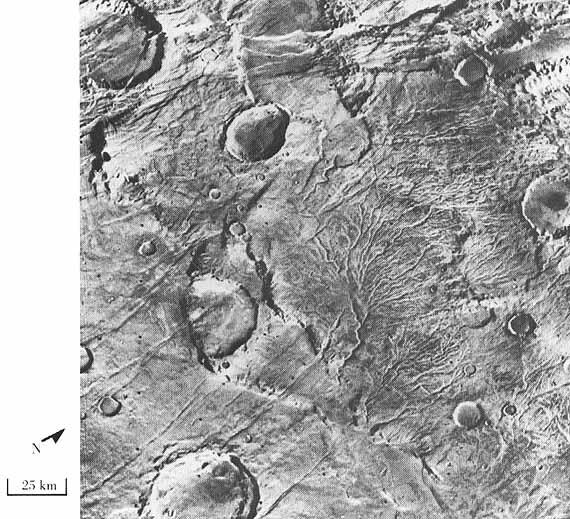
Branched channels in Thaumasia quadrangle, as seen by Viking Orbiter. Networks of channels like this are strong evidence for rain on Mars in the past.

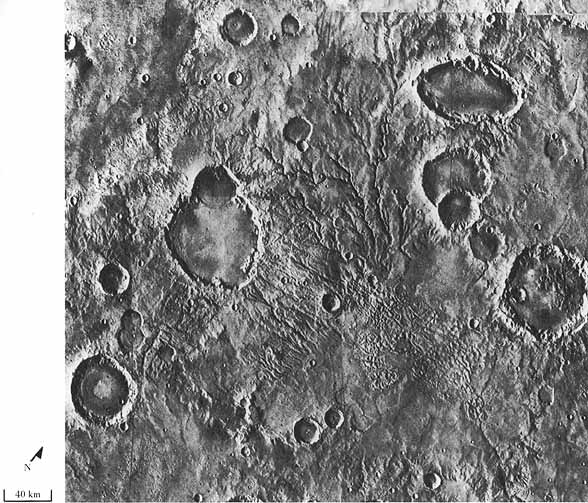
The branched channels seen by Viking from orbit strongly suggested that it rained on Mars in the past. Image is located in Margaritifer Sinus quadrangle.

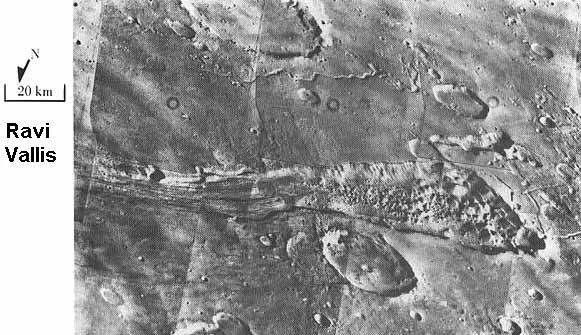
Ravi Vallis, as seen by Viking Orbiter. Ravi Vallis was probably formed when catastrophic floods came out of the ground to the right (chaotic terrain). Image located in Margaritifer Sinus quadrangle.

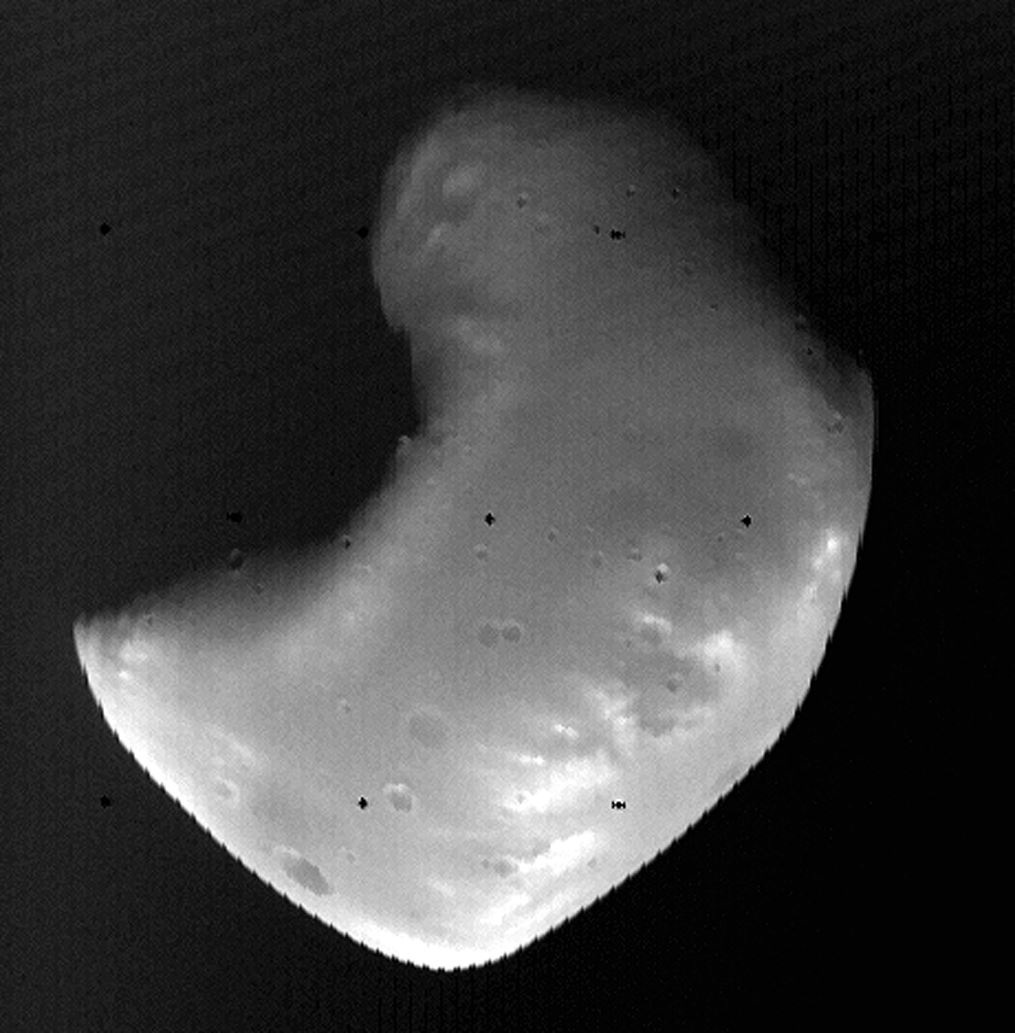
Deimos, photo taken in 1977.

== See also ==
- Exploration of Mars
- List of missions to Mars
- List of Mars orbiters
- Timeline of artificial satellites and space probes
- U.S. Space Exploration History on U.S. Stamps
- Viking lander biological experiments
