= Bok =

Bok or BOK may refer to:

== Places ==
- Bok (lunar crater), on the Moon's far side
- Bok (Martian crater)
- Bok, Khash, a village in Sistan and Baluchestan Province, Iran
- Bok, Orašje, a village near Orašje, Bosnia, Bosnia and Herzegovina
- 1983 Bok, an asteroid
- Brookings Airport, IATA code BOK

== People ==
- Bok (surname)
- Johannes Bok de Korver (1883–1957), Dutch footballer
- Bok van Blerk (born Louis Andreas Pepler, 1978), South African musician

== Arts, entertainment, and media ==
- Bok, the title of the Vahnatai leaders in the Avernum video games
- Bok, an animated gargoyle from the Doctor Who serial The Dæmons

== Businesses ==
- Bank of Kaohsiung, a commercial bank in Taiwan
- Bank of Khartoum, a commercial bank in Sudan
- Bank of Khyber, a provincial government-owned bank in Peshawar, Pakistan
- Bank of Korea, the South Korean central bank
- BOK Financial Corporation, headquartered in Tulsa, Oklahoma, United States

== Science and technology ==
- BOK (gene), full name BCL2-related ovarian killer
- Bok globule, dark clouds of dense cosmic dust
- Bok Prize, awarded by the Astronomical Society of Australia
- Bok Telescope, Arizona, United States

== Other uses ==
- Body of knowledge, the complete set of concepts, terms and activities that make up a professional domain
- BOK Center, an arena in Tulsa, Oklahoma, United States
- Derek Bok Public Service Prizes, awarded at Harvard University, United States
- Edward W. Bok Technical High School in Philadelphia, Pennsylvania, United States
- Bok, an alternative spelling of Bock, a type of beer
- Springbok, Antelope native to southern and southwestern Africa

== See also ==
- Bok bok (disambiguation)
- Boks (disambiguation)
