= Boks =

Boks may refer to:

== People ==
- Evert Jan Boks (1838–1914), Dutch painter
- Joost Boks (1942–2020), Dutch field hockey player

== Sports ==
- The South Africa national rugby union team, commonly known as the Springboks or Boks

== See also ==
- Danish Open (tennis), also known as e-Boks Open
- Bok (disambiguation)
