= Bok (surname) =

- Languages: Chinese (Hokkien), Dutch, German, Korean, Swedish

Origin
- Meaning: Dutch and German: 'billy goat'; Korean: 'divination'; Swedish: 'beech'

Bok is a surname of several origins.

== Origins ==
As a Chinese surname, Bok transcribes the Hokkien pronunciations of various surnames spelled in Mandarin Pinyin as Mu (e.g. 牧 'herder'; 穆 'elegant') or Mo (莫). Hokkien spellings of Chinese surnames are often found in Malaysia and Singapore, where many descendants of Chinese migrants can trace their roots to the Fujian province of China.

The Dutch surname Bok comes from the Dutch word for billy goat, bok. Similarly, the Jewish surname Bok, a variant spelling of Bock, originated from the German word for billy goat, Bock.

Bok is the spelling in Revised Romanization of one Korean surname meaning 'divination' (Hanja: 卜; referred to in Korean as 점 복; Jeom Bok or 무 복; Mu Bok). The character used to write this surname, Radical 25, is also used for the Chinese surname now pronounced Bǔ in Standard Mandarin. The largest Korean clan bearing this surname, the Myeoncheon Bok clan, claims common descent from Bok Ji-gyeom, one of the four generals who overthrew Gung Ye of the state of Taebong in 918 and installed King Taejo in his place as the first king of the Goryeo dynasty.

As a Swedish surname, Bok originated as an ornamental surname, from bok 'beech'.

Bok is also a Slovenian surname.

== Statistics ==
In the Netherlands, there were 1,751 people with the surname Bok and five with the surname Bók as of 2007, up from 1,197 in 1947.

The 2000 South Korean Census found 8,644 people in 2,663 households with the surname Bok; 7,471 of those were members of the Myeoncheon Bok clan.

The 2010 United States census found 738 people with the surname Bok, making it the 31,383rd-most-common name in the country. This represented an increase from 599 (35,522nd-most-common) in the 2000 Census. In the 2010 census, 73.71% of the bearers of the surname identified as White, and 21.41% as Asian.

== Notable people with the surname ==
- Bart Bok (1906–1983), Dutch-born American astronomer
- Benjamin Bok (born 1995), Dutch chess grandmaster
- Chip Bok (born 1952), American cartoonist
- Christian Bök (born 1966), Canadian experimental poet
- Curtis Bok (1897–1962), Pennsylvania Supreme Court justice
- Derek Bok (born 1930), American lawyer and president of Harvard University
- Edward Bok (1863–1930), Dutch-born American publisher, author, and editor of Ladies' Home Journal
- Erika Bók (fl. 1994–2011), Hungarian actress
- Francis Bok (born 1979), Dinka tribesman and abolitionist
- Bok Geo-il (born 1946), South Korean novelist
- Gideon Bok (born 1966), American painter
- Gordon Bok (born 1939), American folklorist and singer-songwriter
- Hannes Bok (1914–1964), pen name of American illustrator Wayne Woodard
- Henri Bok (born 1950), Dutch bass clarinetist
- Hilary Bok (born 1959), American author and professor of philosophy
- Khundi Panda (born Bok Hyeon, 1997), South Korean rapper and songwriter
- Kenzie Bok (born 1989), American local politician in Boston
- Marike Bok (1943–2017), Dutch portrait painter
- Martijn Bok (born 1973), Dutch tennis player
- Miloš Bok (born 1968), Czech composer
- Priscilla Fairfield Bok (1896–1975), American astronomer
- Richard Bok (born 1969), Singaporean soccer coach
- Scott Bok, American lawyer
- Sissela Bok (born 1934), Swedish-born American philosopher and ethicist
- Willem Eduard Bok (1846–1904), Dutch-born South African Boer politician
- Willem Eduard Bok Jr. (1880–1956), South African lawyer, son of the above

== See also ==
- Bok (disambiguation)
