= Bok bok (disambiguation) =

Bok bok may refer to:

- a band Bok Bok formed by Steve Garvey in 1980
- a band Bok Bok formed by Alex Sushon around 2003
- Bok bok sing
