= Gideon Bok =

American painter

Gideon Bok (born 1966) is an American painter who lives and works in Maine. He earned his B.A. from Hampshire College and his M.F.A. from Yale University. He has gone on to teach painting and drawing at Hampshire, but is on leave from his position.

He received a 2004 John Simon Guggenheim Memorial Fellowship and the Hassam, Speicher, Betts, and Symons Fund Purchase Award through The American Academy of Arts and Letters in 2005. Bok's work has been written up in The New York Times, Time Out New York, ARTnews, Art New England, and The Boston Globe.

He is represented by Alpha Gallery in Boston.

Prominent Maine folklorist Gordon Bok is his uncle.
