= Evert Jan Boks =

Dutch painter

Evert Jan Boks (18 April 1838 – 14 June 1914) was a Dutch painter. Evert-Jan Boks was a pupil of Arie Lieman and Willem Riem Vis in Apeldoorn. He continued his studies at the Royal Academy in Antwerp, where he won a first prize in 1863. Later on, he also won the Prix de Rome. After study tours, mainly in France and Italy, he permanently settled in Antwerp, and married Elie Voet. Their house which they inhabited life-long in Antwerp, still exists in the rue Lamorinière. Many of his works went to the United States at a time when the first American tourists began to visit Europe in large numbers in tours organised by the steamship companies. He took an active part in artistic and social life in Antwerp. Boks frequently exhibited in Belgium and at the Paris Salons. He was awarded the Order of Leopold by the Belgian Government. Boks was a sincere, a good draughtsman and a colourist of great merit, who was a credit to the Royal Academy of Antwerp where he was one of the most outstanding pupils. His works are genuine and none would dispute them. Their popular acclaim was echoed within the artistic world. Period: Beekbergen (Apeldoorn) 1838 - Antwerp 1914 Belgian School Exhibitions: Antwerp - Mons

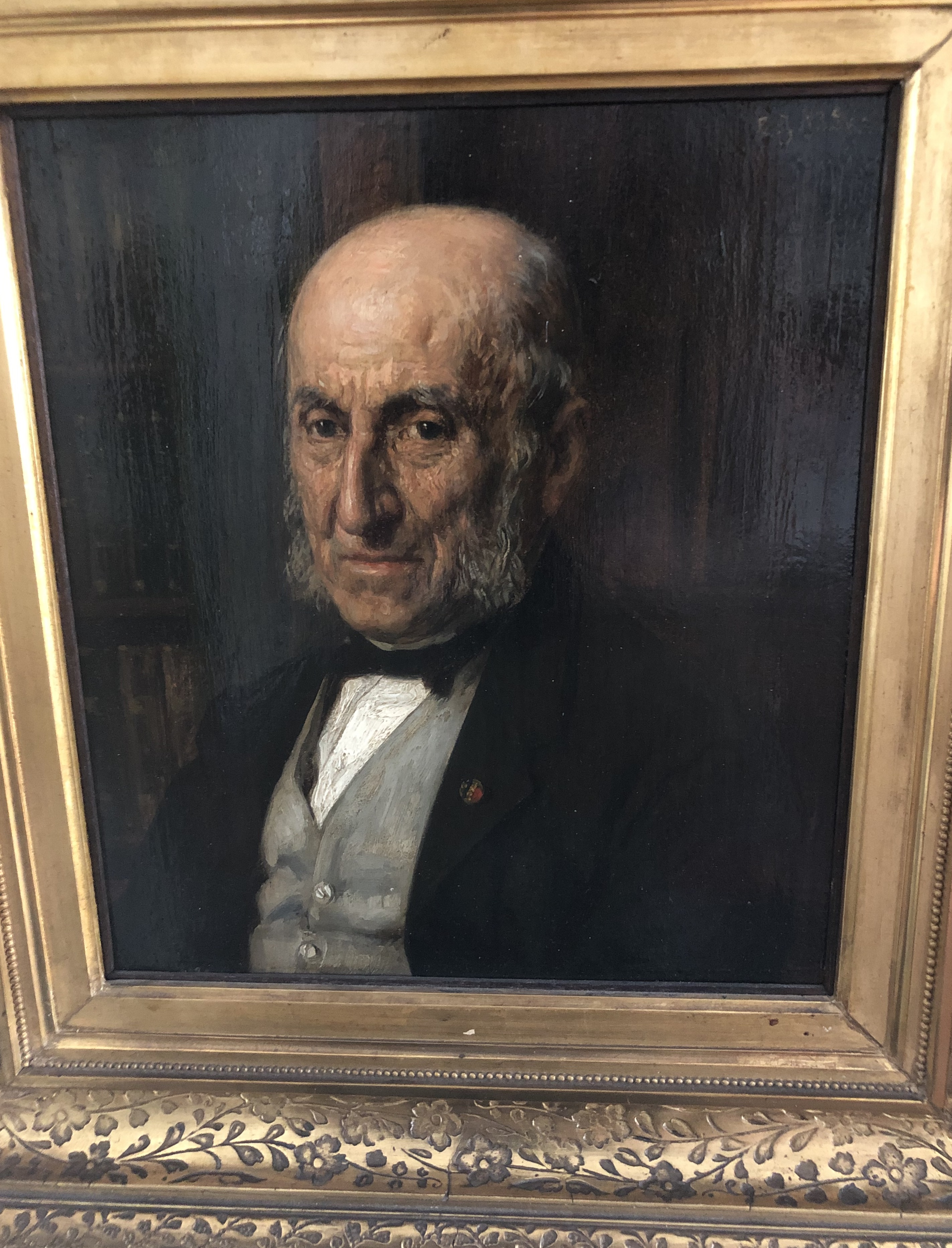
Portrait painting

== Gallery ==
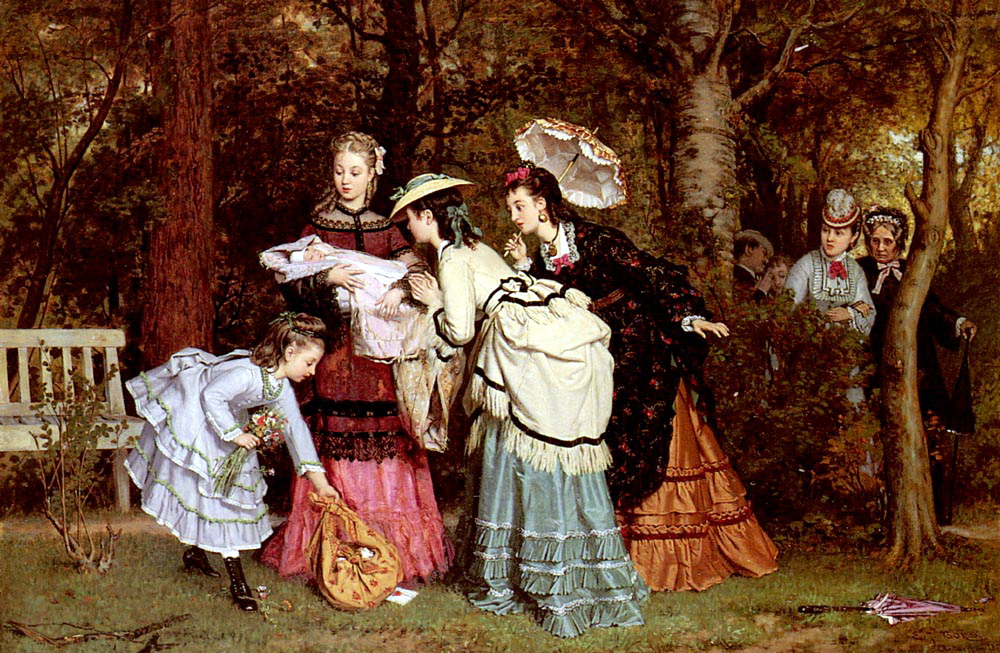

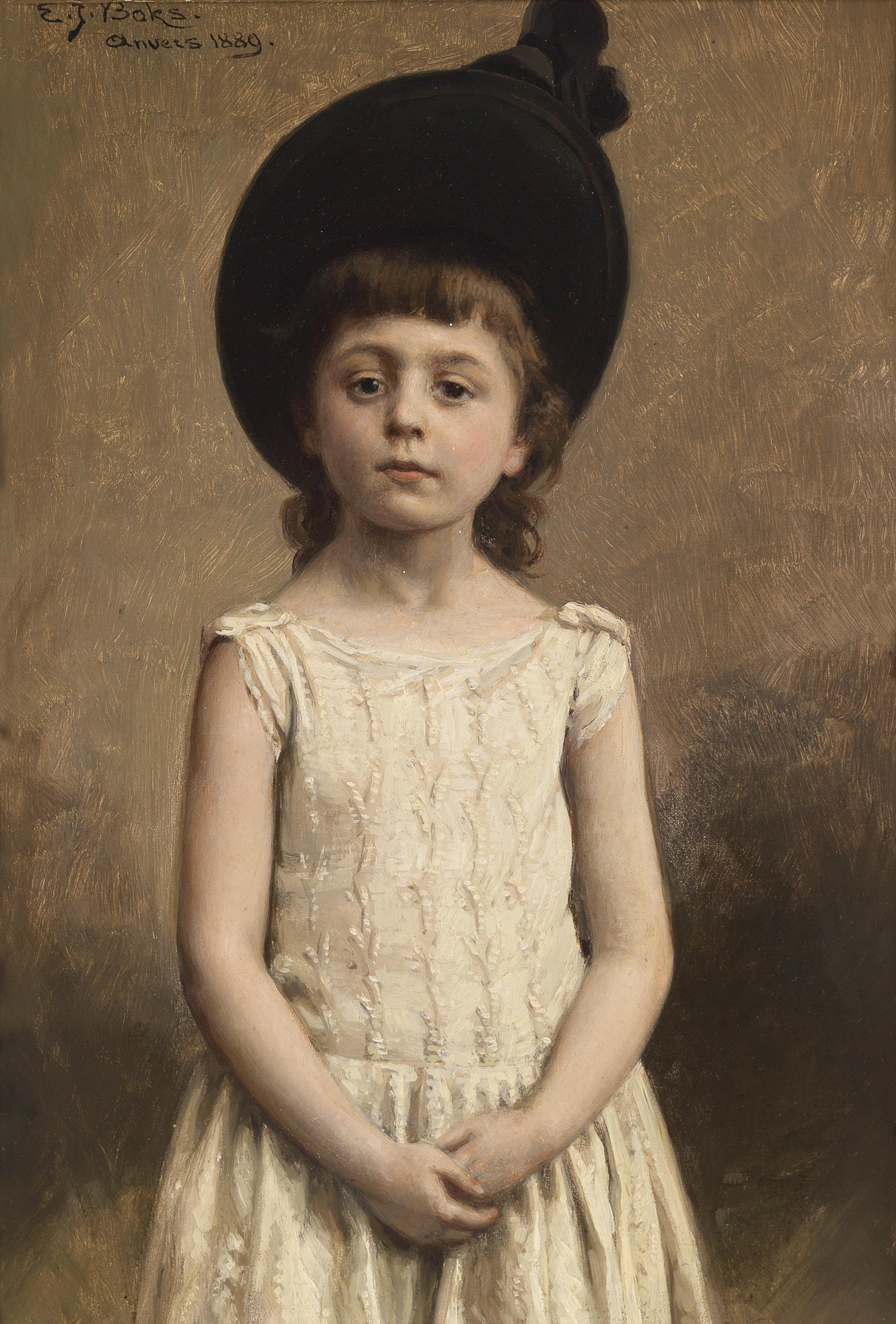

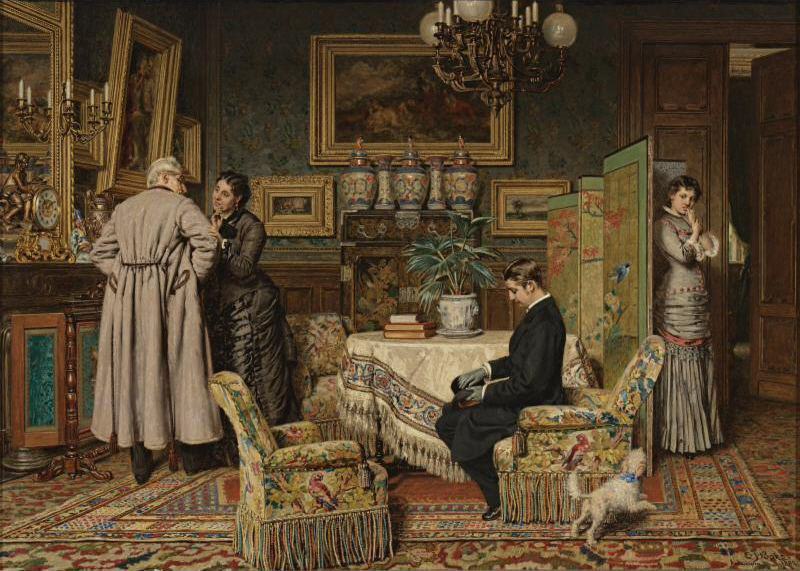

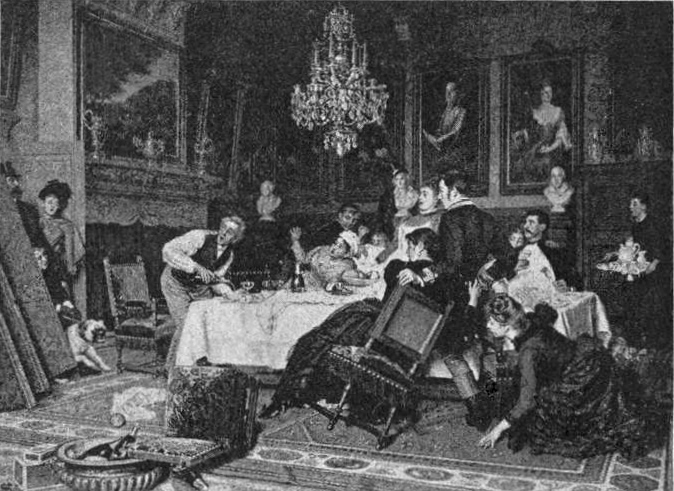

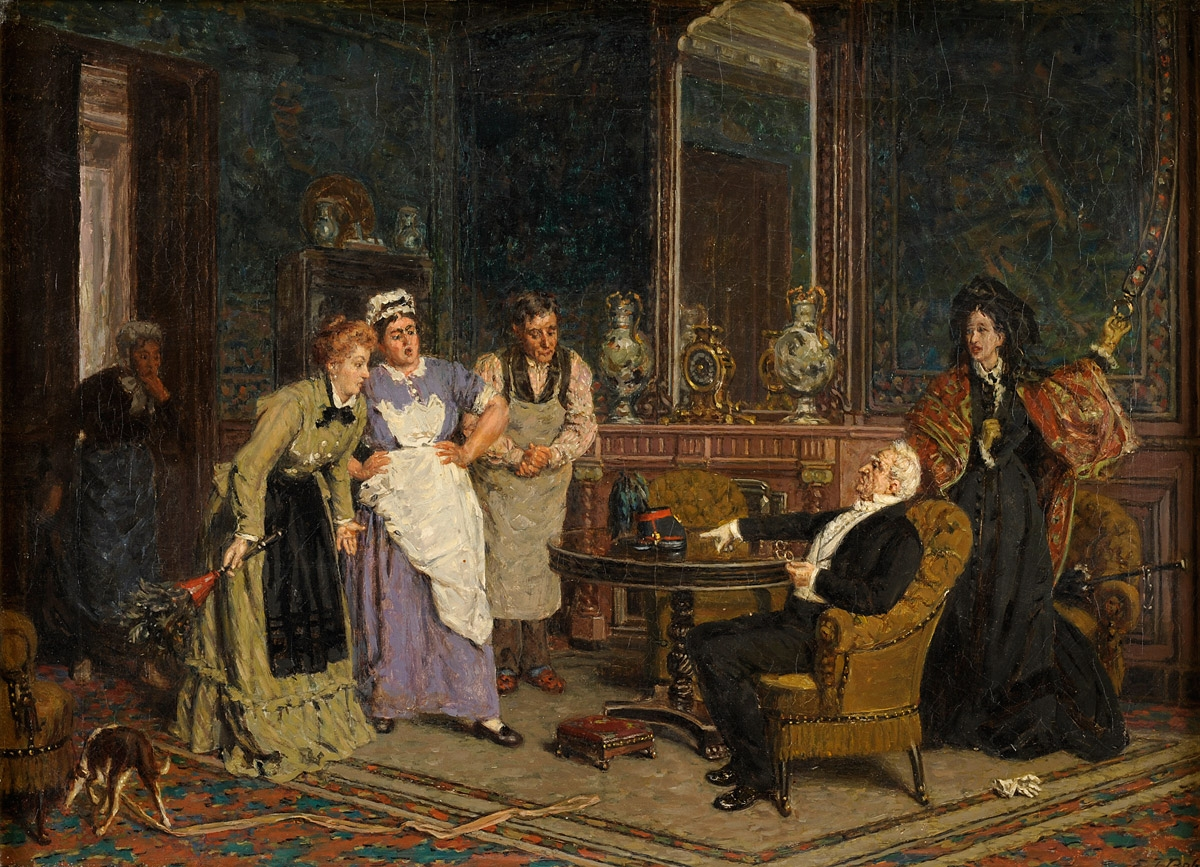
