= Joost Boks =

Dutch field hockey player (1942–2020)

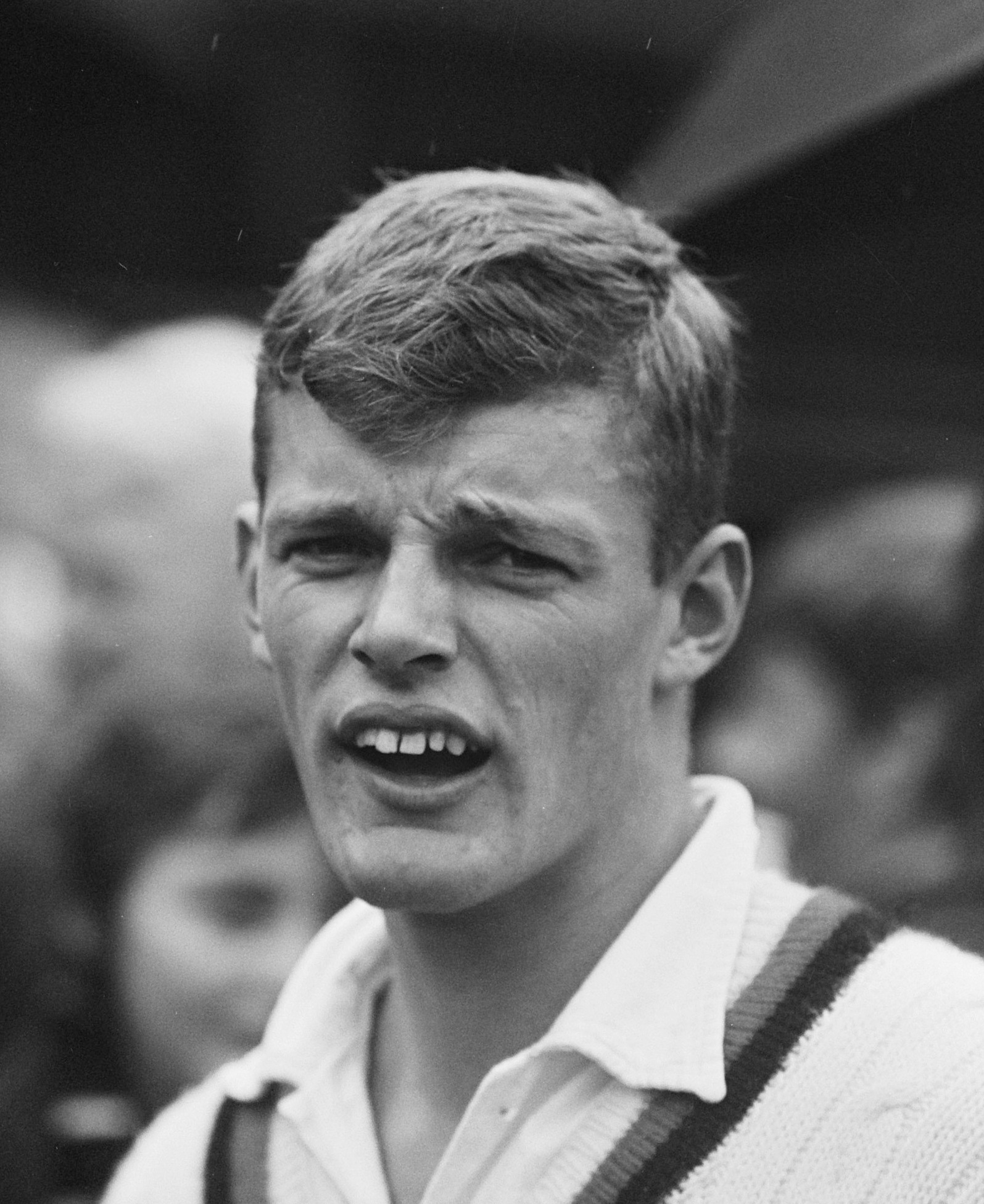
- Joost Boks in 1963

Personal information
- Born: 17 April 1942 Amsterdam, the Netherlands
- Died: 12 June 2020 (aged 78) Georgetown, Ontario, Canada
- Height: 1.86 m (6 ft 1 in)
- Weight: 87 kg (192 lb)

Sport
- Sport: Field hockey
- Club: AB&HC, Amsterdam

Joost Boks (17 April 1942 – 12 June 2020) was a field hockey goalkeeper from the Netherlands. He competed at 1964 and 1968 Summer Olympics, where his team finished in seventh and fifth place, respectively.

After his career he lived in Georgetown, Ontario, Canada, where he died in 2020.
