= Gold (crater) =

Crater on Mars

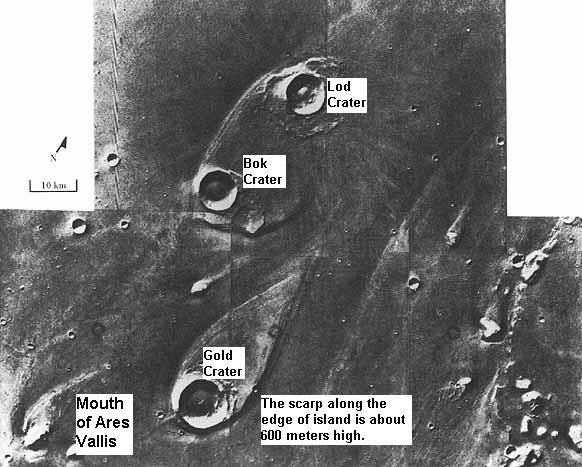
- Tear-drop shaped islands caused by flood waters from Ares Vallis, as seen by Viking Orbiter. The islands were formed by the ejecta of Lod, Bok, and Gold craters.
- Planet: Mars
- Coordinates: 20.03°N 328.76°E
- Quadrangle: Oxia Palus
- Diameter: 8.91 km (5.54 mi)
- Eponym: A town in Pennsylvania

Gold is a crater in the Oxia Palus quadrangle of Mars. It was named after a town in Potter County, Pennsylvania in 1976.

Gold is famous as being one of several craters showing clear evidence that it was affected by floods of water from Ares Vallis on Mars.

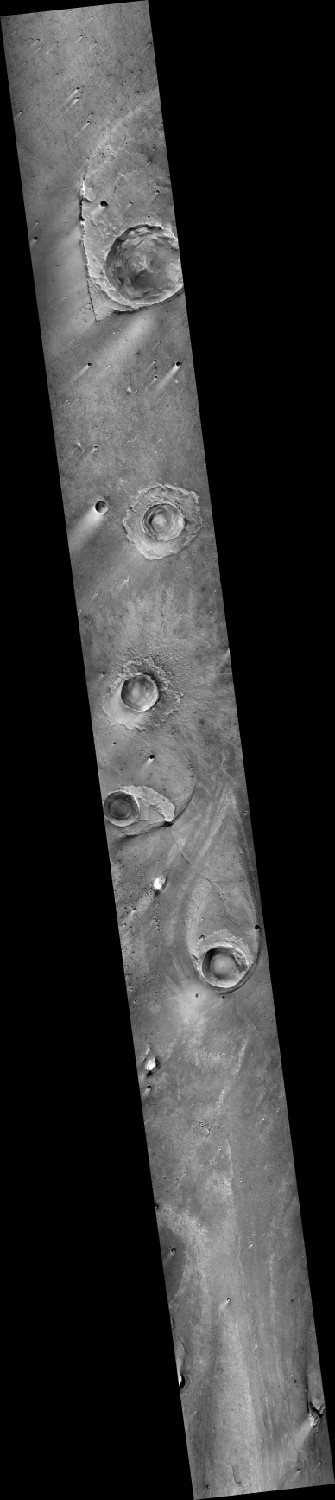
CTX camera image

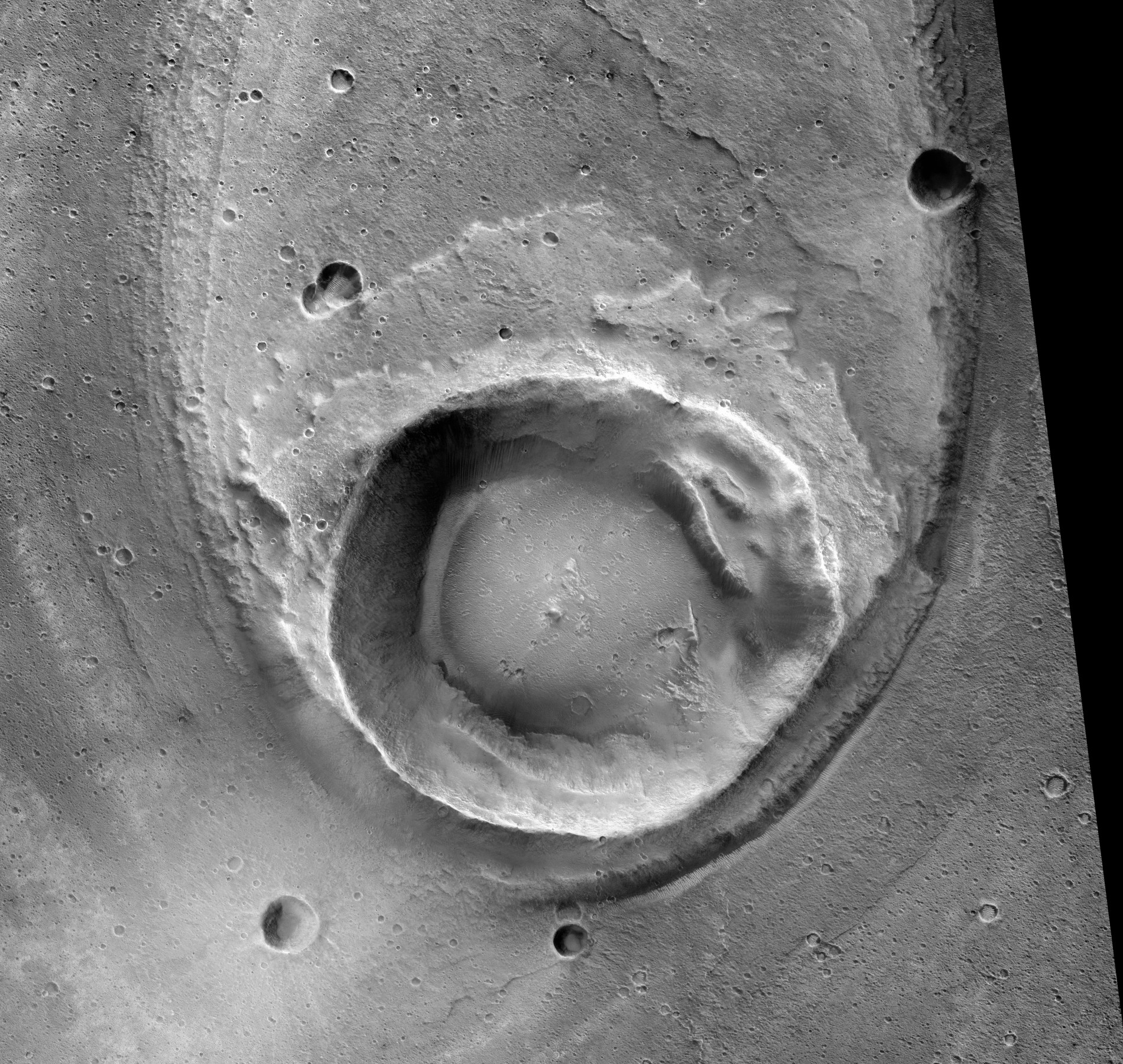
Enlargement showing Gold
