= Lod (crater) =

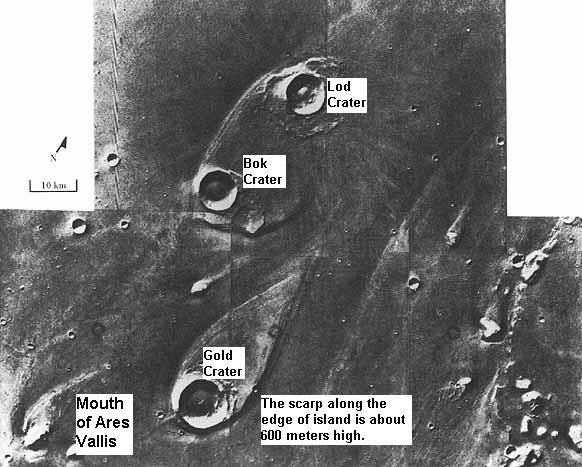
- Tear-drop shaped islands caused by flood waters from Ares Vallis, as seen by Viking Orbiter. The islands were formed by the ejecta of Lod, Bok, and Gold craters.
- Planet: Mars
- Coordinates: 20.98°N 328.46°E
- Quadrangle: Oxia Palus
- Diameter: 7.6 km (4.7 mi)
- Eponym: Lod, Israel

Lod is a crater in the Oxia Palus quadrangle of Mars. It is named after the city of Lod, Israel in 1976.

Lod is famous for showing clear evidence that it was affected by floods of water from Ares Vallis on Mars.

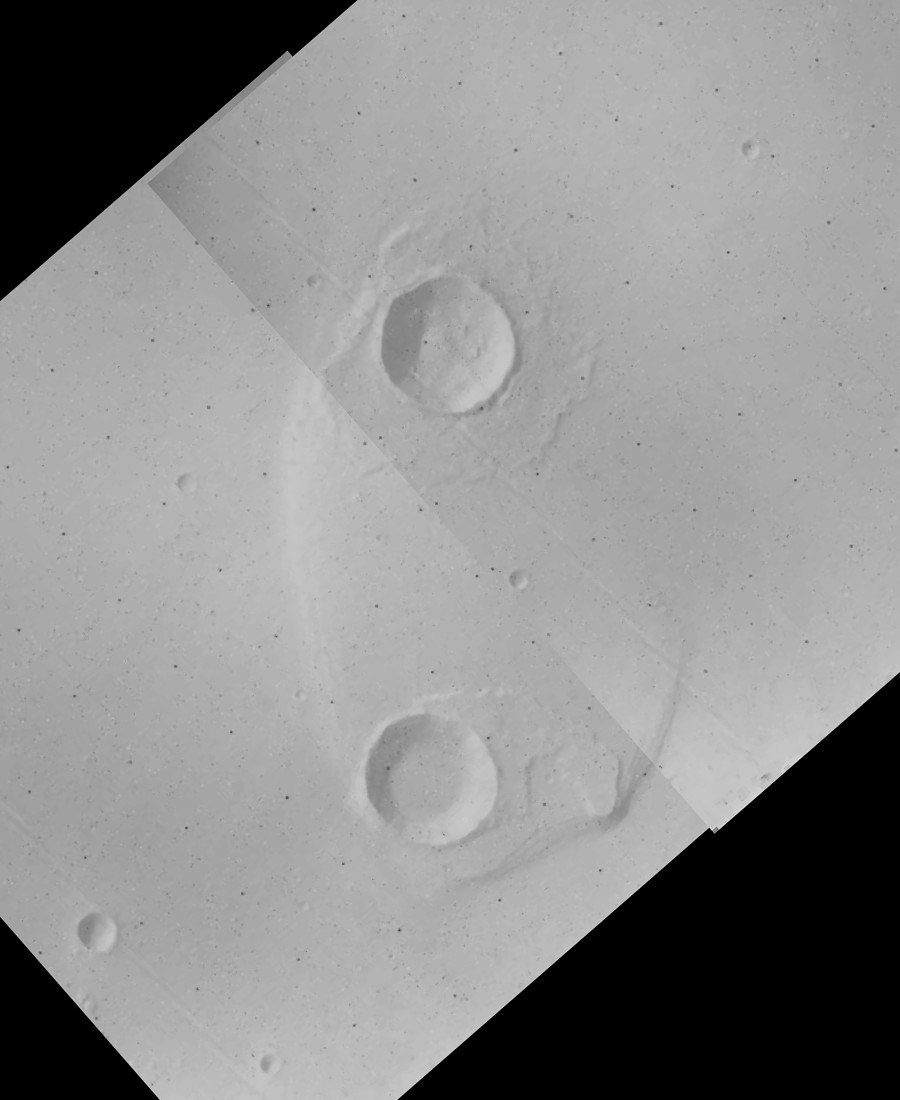
Viking Orbiter 1 mosaic showing Lod (top) and Bok (bottom)

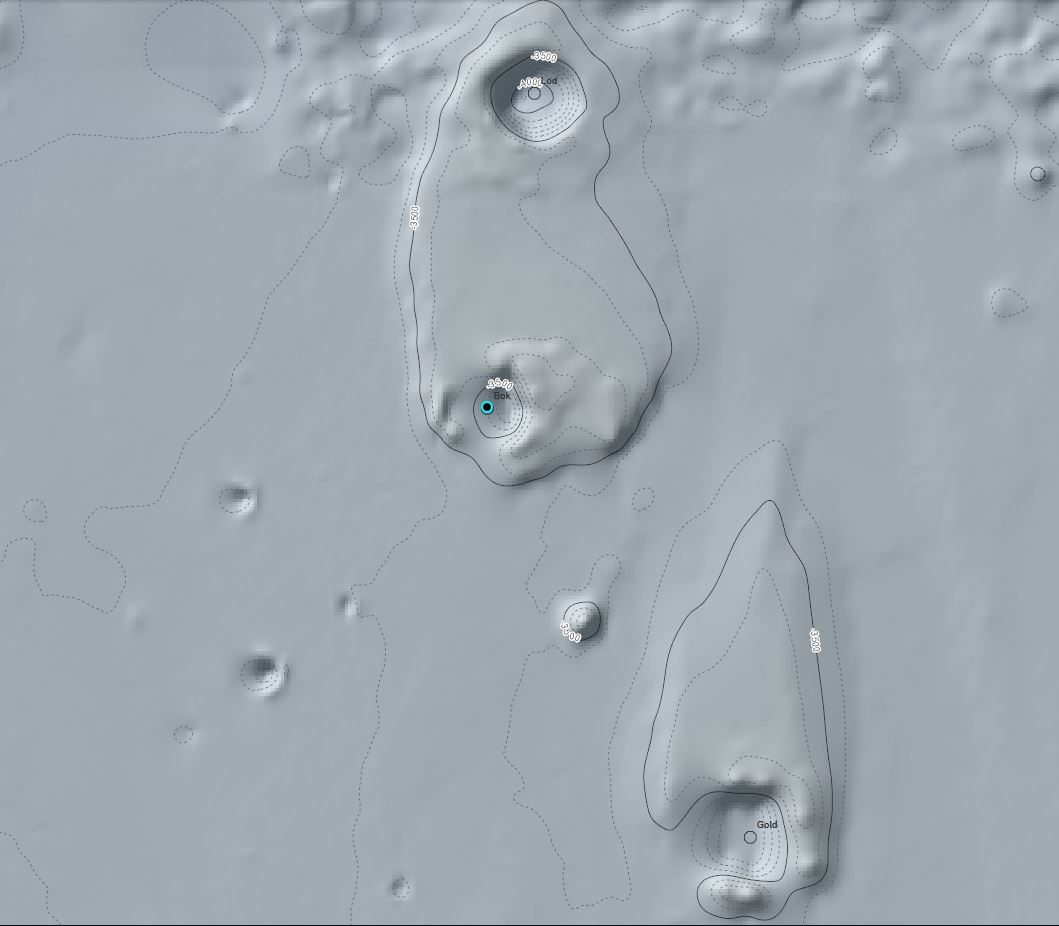
Topographic map of the area around Bok

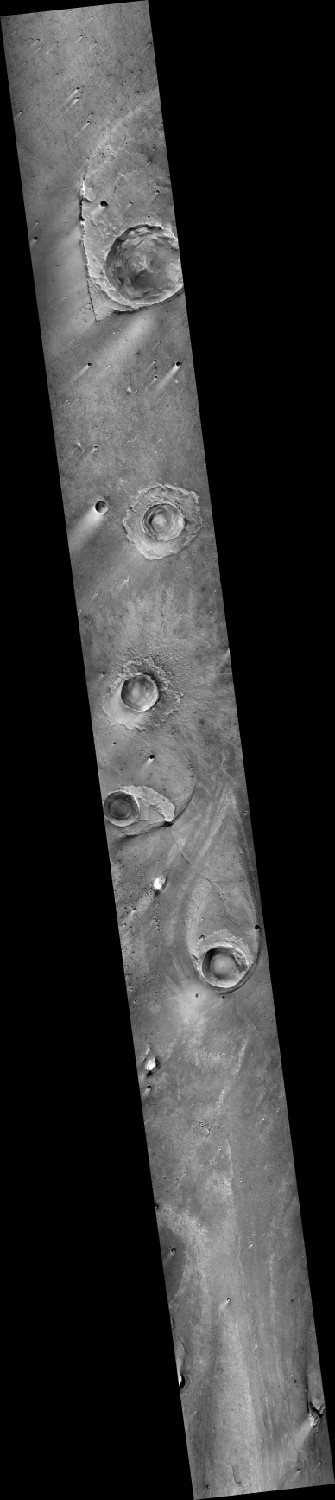
CTX camera image

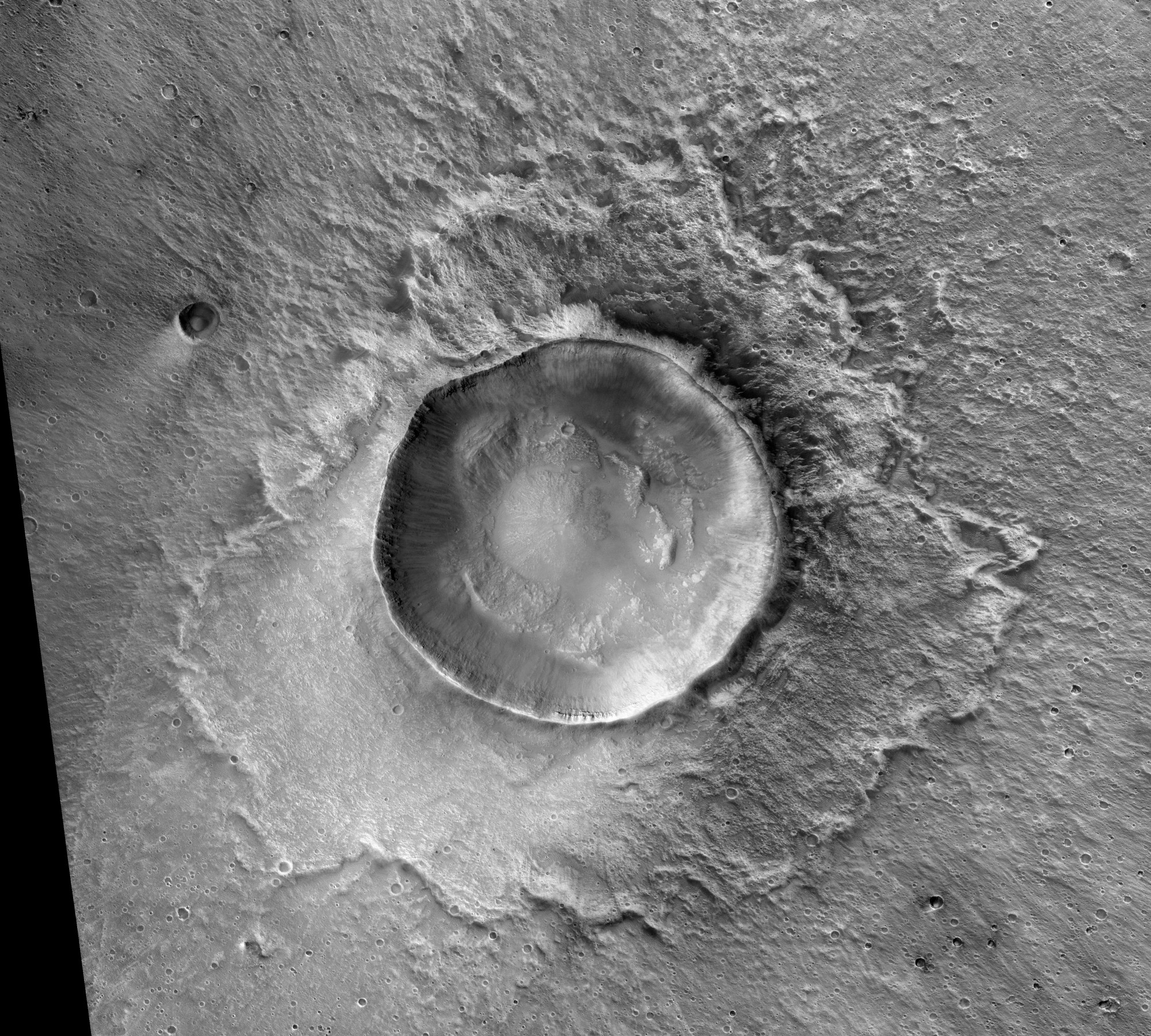
Enlargement showing Lod
