= Bok bok sing =

Chinese snack food

Bok bok sing is a leisure snack and the first joint venture brand and program in China first released in Guangzhou, China. It is fried potato balls with a logo of an old witch clawing on a great ball on the package.

== Background ==
With China's economic reform and the normalization of China-US relations, Guangdong was chosen to be a testing ground for the reforms and allowing US companies to operate.

Coca-Cola was the first US company in Guangzhou. It brought American technology targeted on China's consumers.

It was sold for 50 cents Chinese Yuan in the 1980s.

== Types ==
Bok bok sing has four package sizes: 12/18/23/50 grams.
