= Bok (Martian crater) =

Crater on Mars

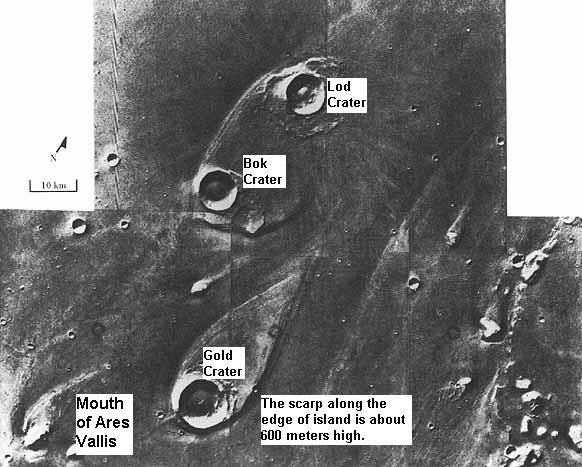
- Tear-drop shaped islands caused by flood waters from Ares Vallis, as seen by Viking Orbiter. The islands were formed by the ejecta of Lod, Bok, and Gold craters.
- Planet: Mars
- Coordinates: 20.58°N 328.4°E
- Quadrangle: Oxia Palus
- Diameter: 7.34 km (4.56 mi)
- Eponym: A town in New Guinea

Bok is a crater in the Oxia Palus quadrangle of Mars. It was named after a town in New Guinea in 1976.

Bok is famous for showing clear evidence that it was affected by floods of water from Ares Vallis on Mars.

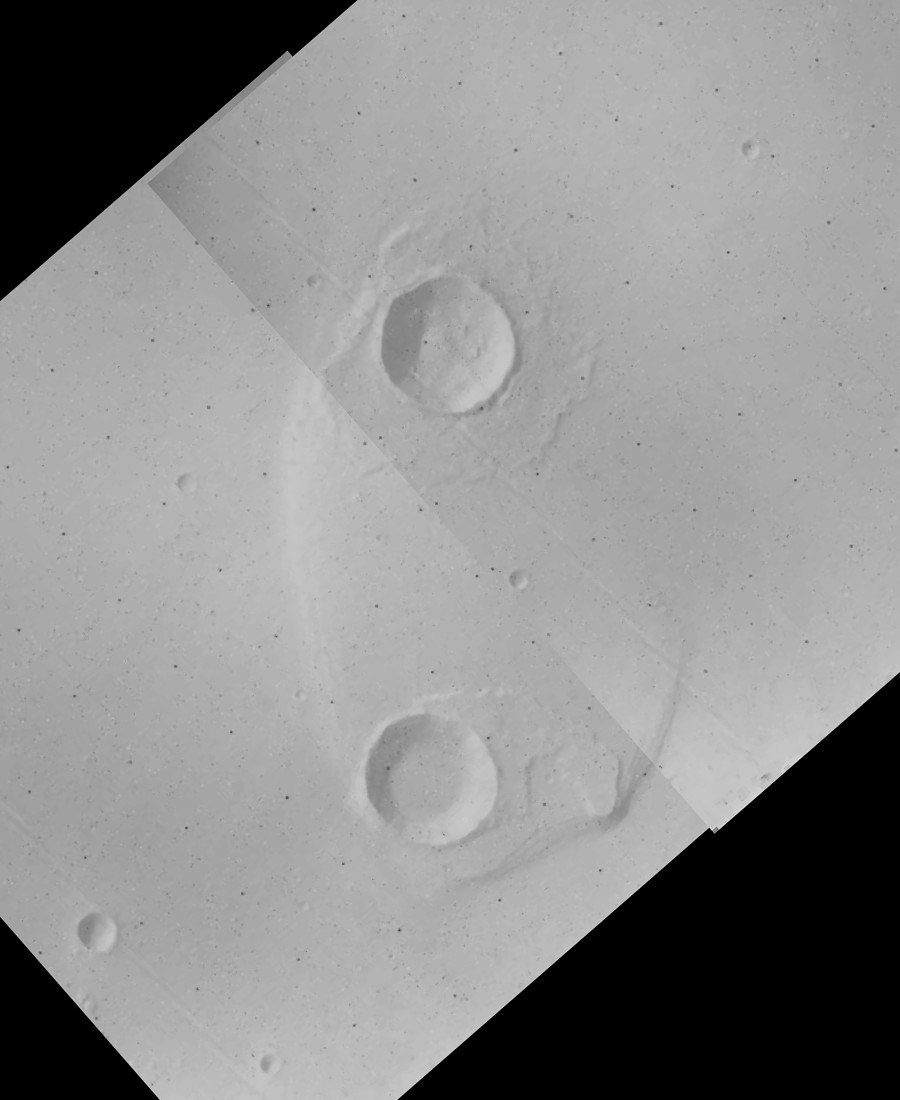
Viking Orbiter 1 mosaic showing Lod (top) and Bok (bottom)

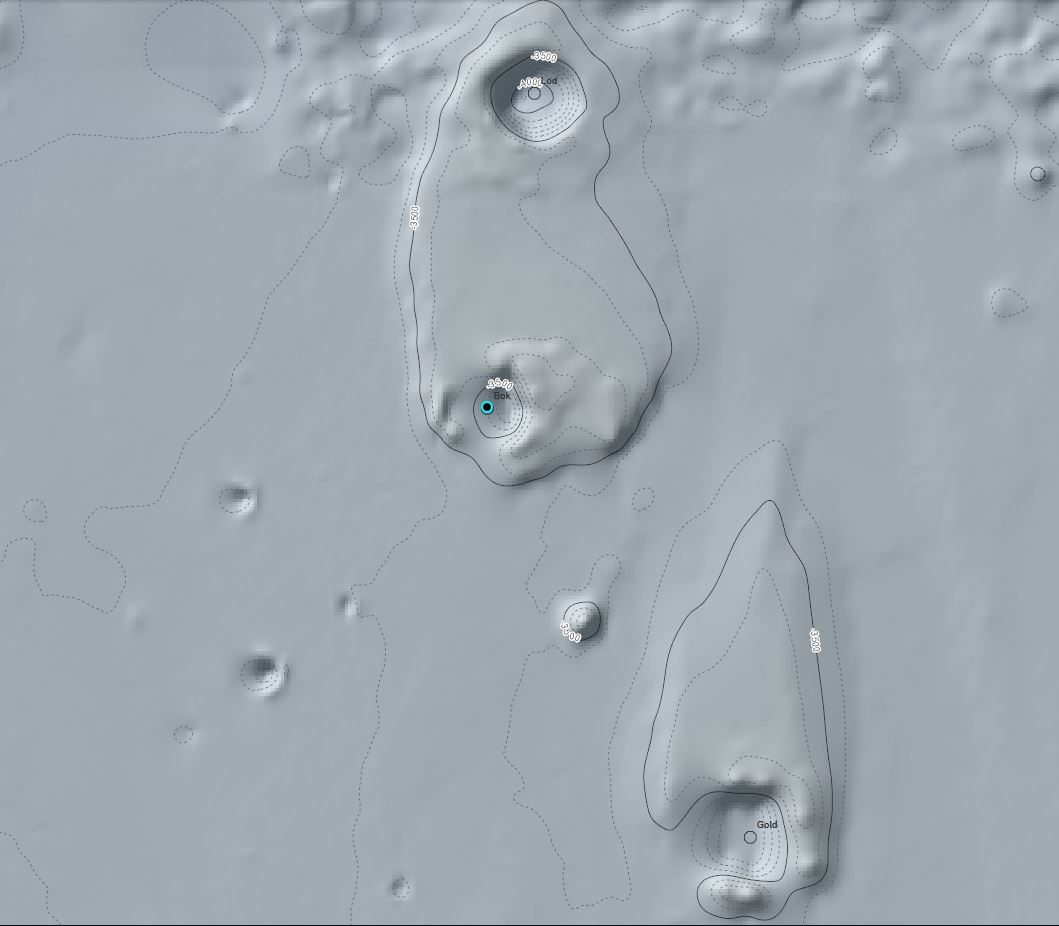
Topographic map of the area around Bok

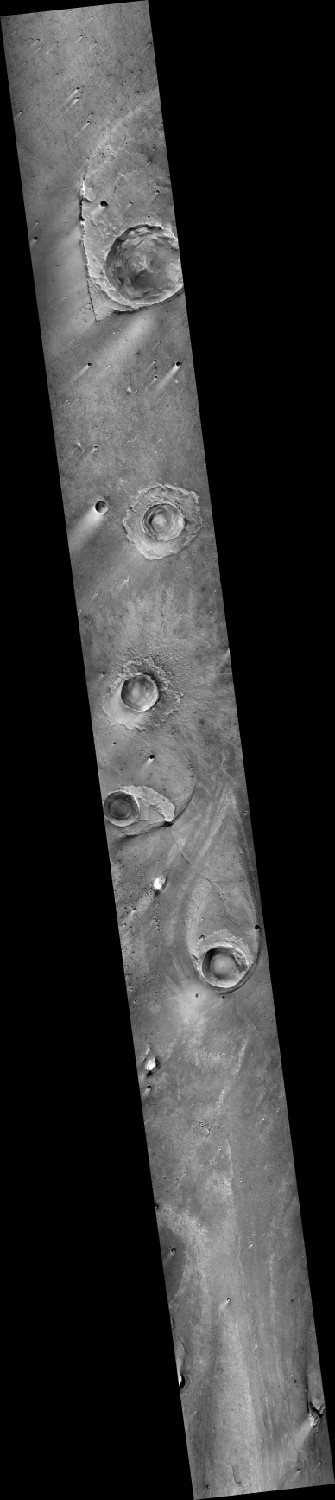
CTX camera image

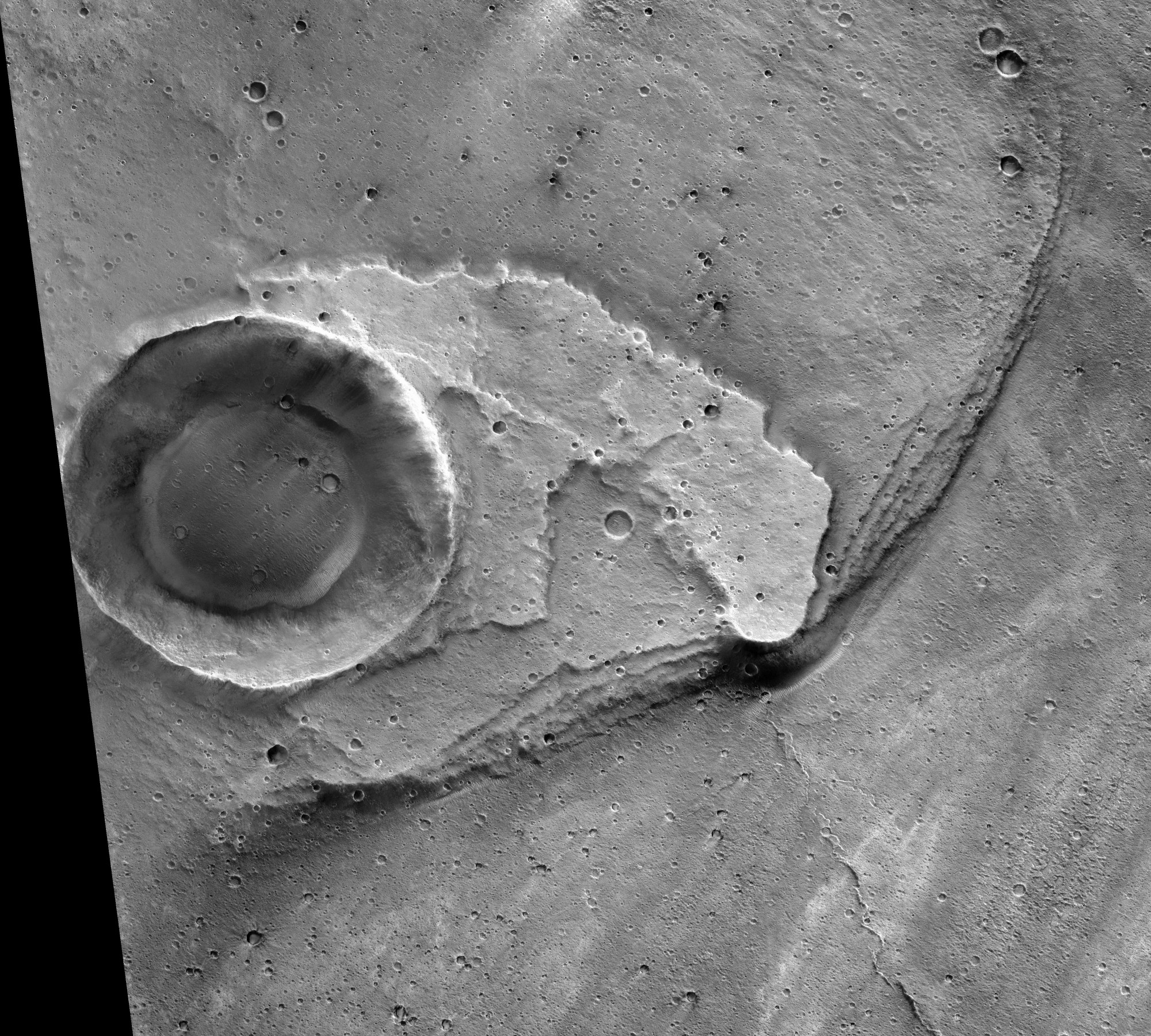
Enlargement showing Bok
