= Peneus Patera =

Patera on Mars

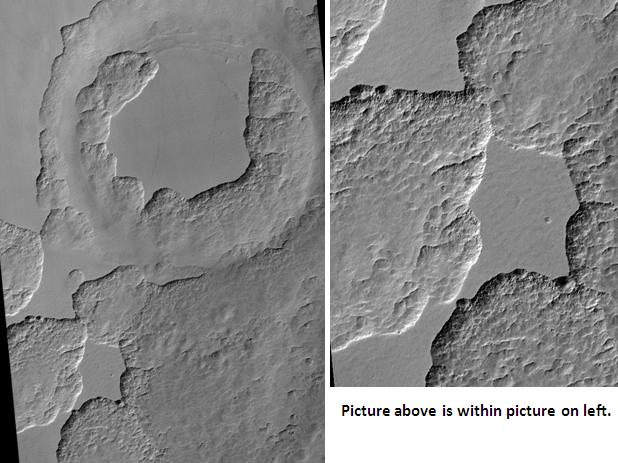
- Scalloped Terrain at Peneus Patera, as seen by HiRISE. Scalloped terrain is quite common in some areas of Mars.
- Coordinates: 58.1°S 307.5°W

Peneus Patera is a feature in the Noachis quadrangle of Mars. It is located at 58.1 S and 307.5 W. It was named after an albedo feature at 48S, 290W.

== Scalloped topography ==
Peneus Patera shows scalloped topography - depressions with scalloped edges. Sometimes the depressions seem to coalesce together. These features typically occur at about 55 degrees north and south latitude. They are believed to form from the removal of subsurface material, maybe interstitial ice by sublimation (change from solid to a gas). More gentle slopes face in the direction of the equator, while steep scarps face the pole. This is probably due to differences in solar heating. The process is believed to be ongoing.

This topography may be of great importance for future colonization of Mars because it may point to deposits of pure ice.

== See also ==
- Climate of Mars
- HiRISE
