= Noachis quadrangle =

Map of Mars

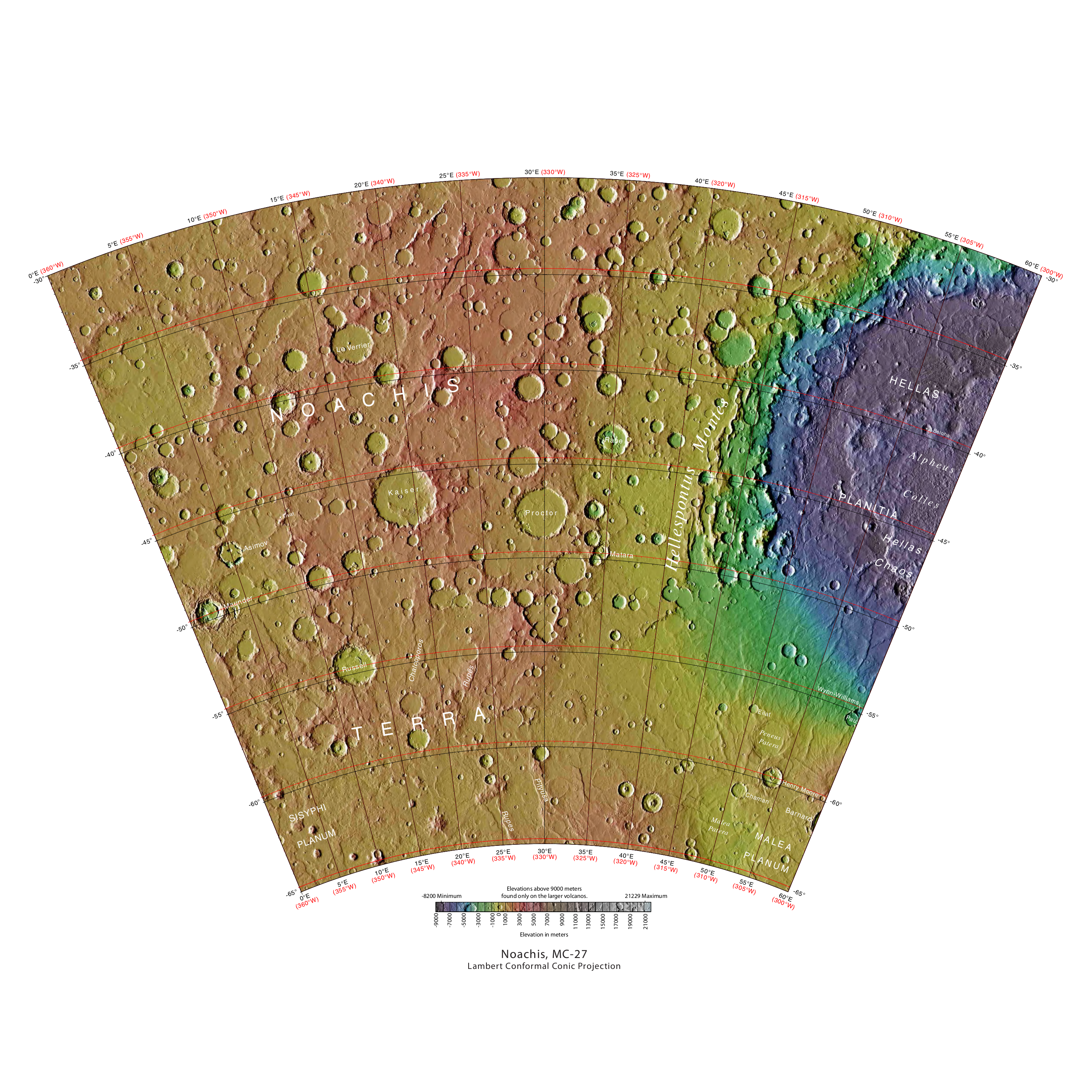
- Map of Noachis quadrangle from Mars Orbiter Laser Altimeter (MOLA) data. The highest elevations are red and the lowest are blue.
- Coordinates: 47.5°S 330°W

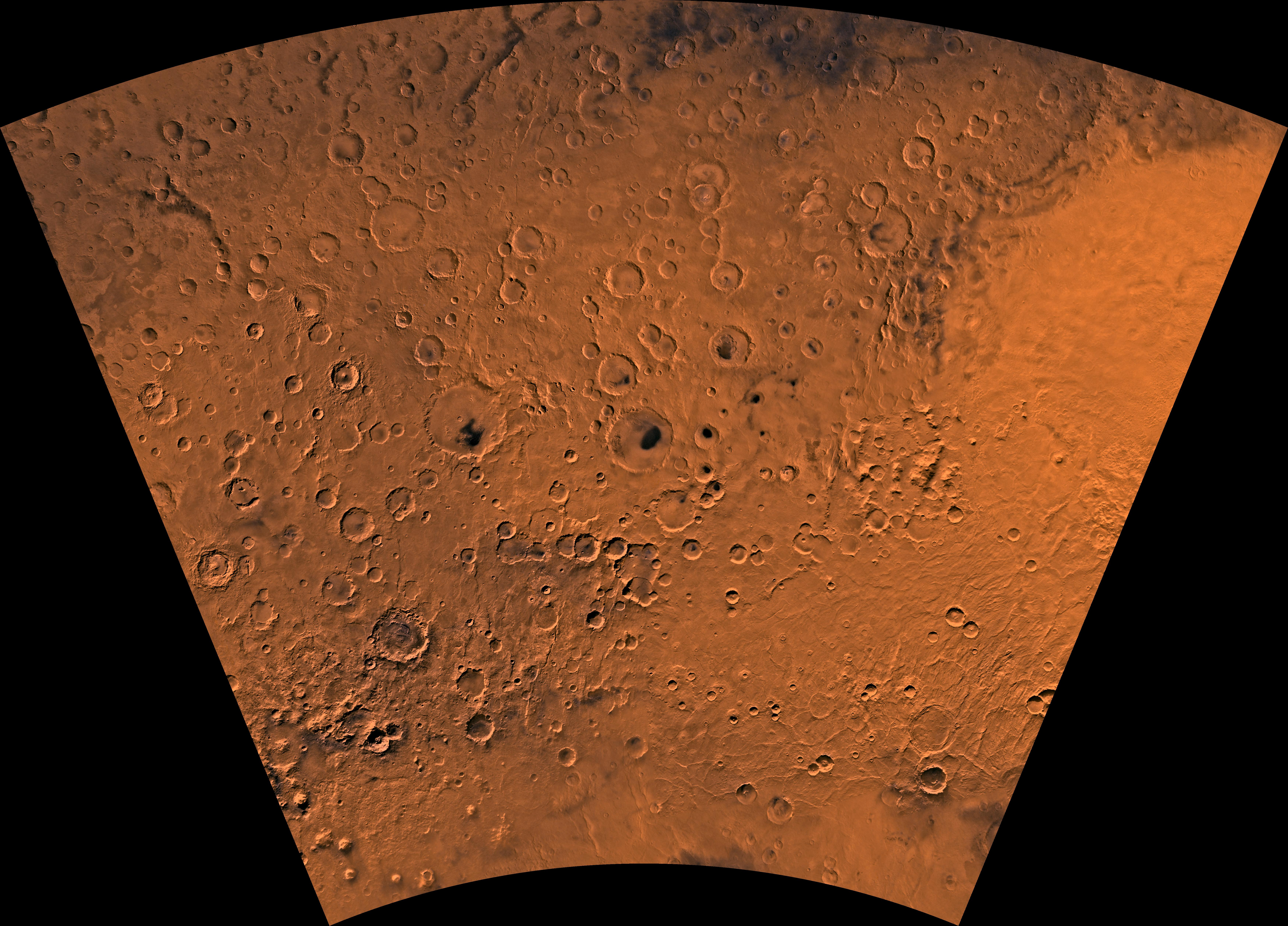
Image of the Noachis Quadrangle (MC-27). The northeast includes the western half of Hellas basin. The southeastern region contains Peneus Patera and part of the Amphitrites volcano.

The Noachis quadrangle is one of a series of 30 quadrangle maps of Mars used by the United States Geological Survey (USGS) Astrogeology Research Program. The Noachis quadrangle is also referred to as MC-27 (Mars Chart-27).

The Noachis quadrangle covers the area from 300° to 360° west longitude and 30° to 65° south latitude on Mars. It lies between the two giant impact basins on Mars: Argyre and Hellas. The Noachis quadrangle includes Noachis Terra and the western part of Hellas Planitia.

Noachis is so densely covered with impact craters that it is considered among the oldest landforms on Mars—hence the term "Noachian" for one of the earliest time periods in martian history. In addition, many previously buried craters are now coming to the surface, where Noachis' extreme age has allowed ancient craters to be filled, and once again newly exposed.

Much of the surface in Noachis quadrangle shows a scalloped topography where the disappearance of ground ice has left depressions.

The first piece of human technology to land on Mars landed (crashed) in the Noachis quadrangle. The Soviet's Mars 2 crashed at 44.2°S 313.2°W. It weighed about one ton. The automated craft attempted to land in a giant dust storm. To make conditions even worse, this area also has many dust devils.

== Scalloped topography ==
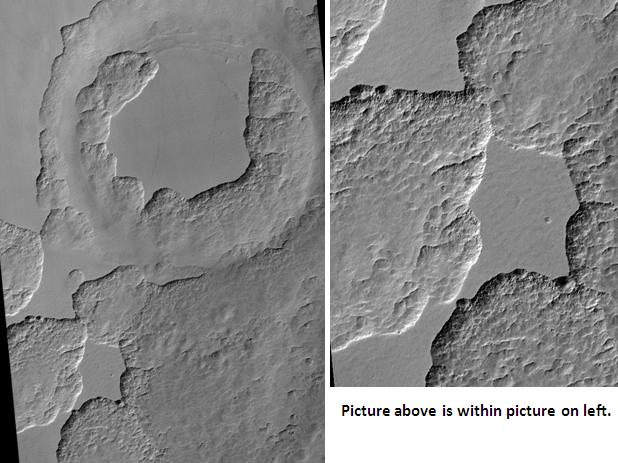
Scalloped Terrain at Peneus Patera, as seen by HiRISE. Scalloped terrain is quite common in some areas of Mars.

Certain regions of Mars display scalloped-shaped depressions. The depressions are believed to be the remains of an ice-rich mantle deposit. Scallops are created when ice sublimates from frozen soil. This mantle material probably fell from the air as ice formed on dust when the climate was different due to changes in the tilt of the Mars pole. The scallops are typically tens of meters deep and from a few hundred to a few thousand meters across. They can be almost circular or elongated. Some appear to have coalesced, thereby causing a large heavily pitted terrain to form. A study published in Icarus, found that the landforms of scalloped topography can be made by the subsurface loss of water ice by sublimation under current Martian climate conditions. Their model predicts similar shapes when the ground has large amounts of pure ice, up to many tens of meters in depth. The process of producing the terrain may begin with sublimation from a crack because there are often polygon cracks where scallops form.

== Dust devil tracks ==
Many areas on Mars experience the passage of giant dust devils. A thin coating of fine bright dust covers most of the Martian surface. When a dust devil goes by it blows away the coating and exposes the underlying dark surface creating tracks. The patterns formed by the dust devil tracks change frequently; sometimes in just a few months. Dust devils have been seen from the ground and from orbit. They even blew the dust off of the solar panels of the two Rovers on Mars, thereby greatly extending their lives. The twin Rovers were designed to last for three months, instead they lasted more than six years and one was still going after over eighteen years. The pattern of the tracks have been shown to change every few months. TA study that combined data from the High Resolution Stereo Camera (HRSC) and the Mars Orbiter Camera (MOC) found that some large dust devils on Mars have a diameter of 700 meters and last at least 26 minutes. Some dust devils are taller than the average tornado on Earth. The image below of Russel Crater shows changes in dust devil tracks over a period of only three months, as documented by HiRISE. Other dust devil tracks are visible in the picture of Frento Vallis.

== Craters ==
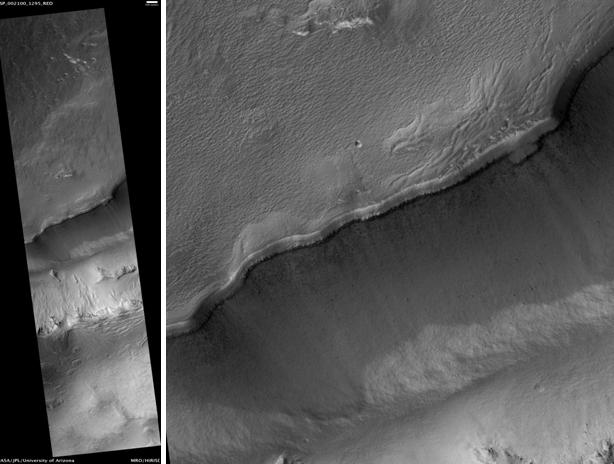
Maunder Crater, as seen by HiRISE. The overhang is part of the degraded south (toward bottom) wall of crater. The scale bar is 500 meters long.

Impact craters generally have a rim with ejecta around them, in contrast volcanic craters usually do not have a rim or ejecta deposits. As craters get larger (greater than 10 km in diameter) they usually have a central peak. The peak is caused by a rebound of the crater floor following the impact. Sometimes craters will display layers. Craters can show us what lies deep under the surface.

== Gullies ==
Gullies on steep slopes are found in certain regions of Mars. Many ideas have been advanced to explain them. Formation by running water when the climate was different is a popular idea. Recently, because changes in gullies have been seen since HiRISE has been orbiting Mars, it is thought that they may be formed by chunks of dry ice moving down slope during spring time. Gullies are one of the most interesting discoveries made by orbiting space craft.

== Hellas floor features ==
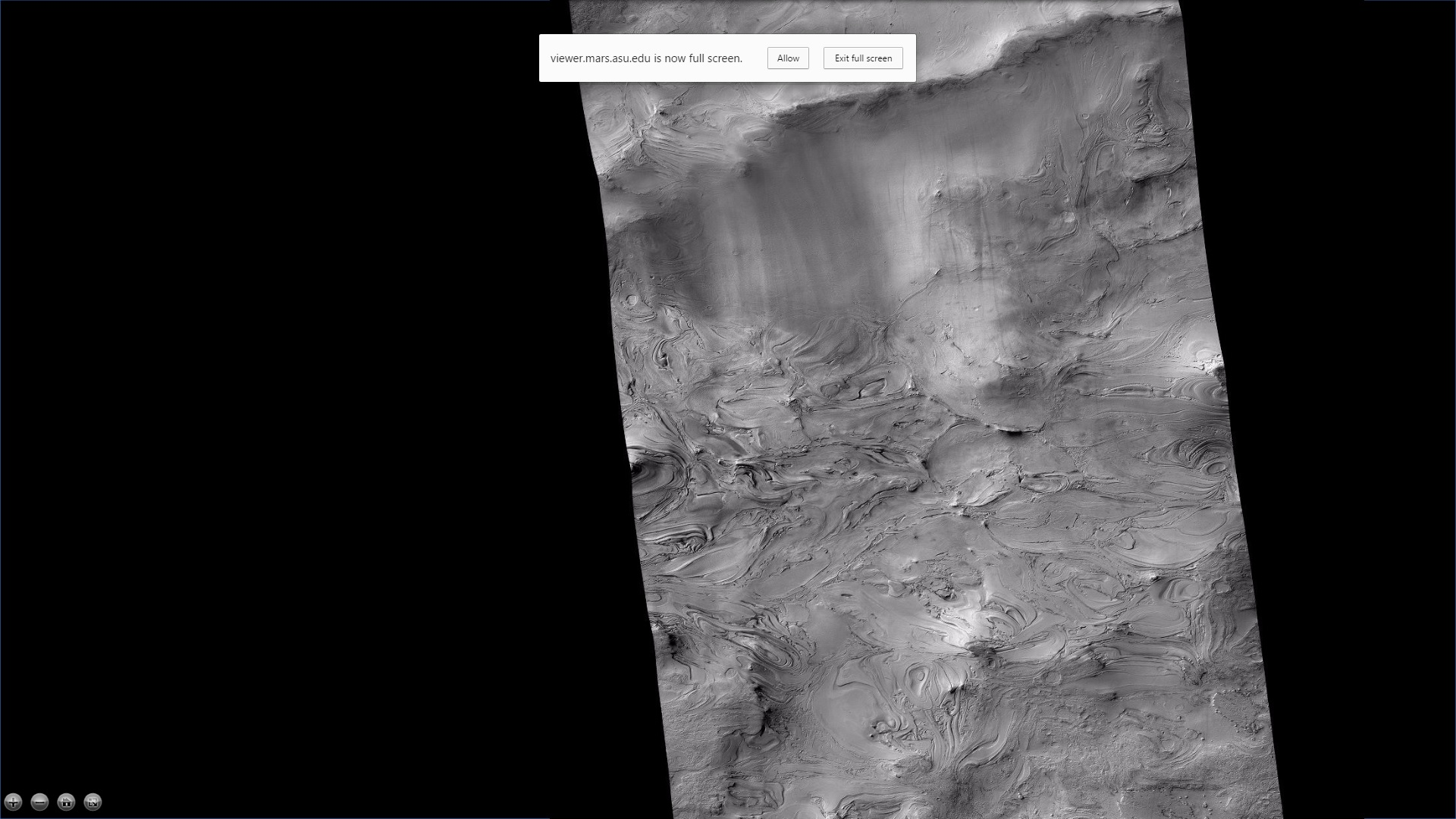
Wide view of part of the floor of the Hellas basin, as seen by CTX

The Hellas floor contains some strange-looking features. One of these features is called "banded terrain." This terrain has also been called "taffy pull" terrain, and it lies near honeycomb terrain, another strange surface. Banded terrain is found in the north-western part of the Hellas basin. This section of the Hellas basin is the deepest. The banded-terrain deposit displays an alternation of narrow band shapes and inter-bands. The sinuous nature and relatively smooth surface texture suggesting a viscous flow origin. A study published in Planetary and Space Science found that this terrain was the youngest deposit of the interior of Hellas. They also suggest in the paper that banded terrain may have covered a larger area of the NW interior of Hellas. The bands can be classified as linear, concentric, or lobate. Bands are typically 3–15 km long, 3 km wide. Narrow inter-band depressions are 65 m wide and 10 m deep.

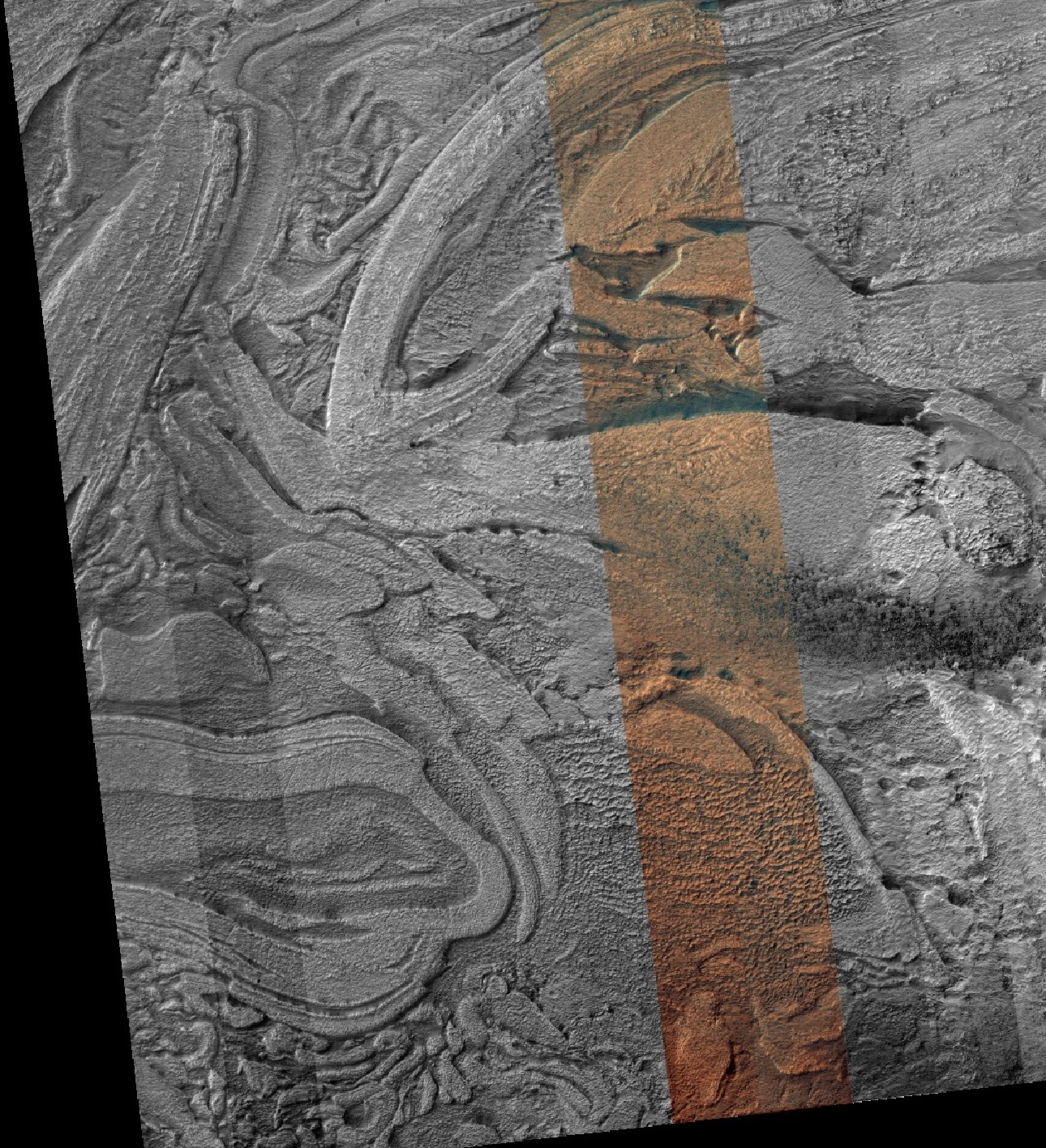
Twisted bands on floor of Hellas, as seen by HiRISE under HiWish program

== See also ==
- Barchan
- Climate of Mars
- Geology of Mars
- Groundwater on Mars
- HiRISE
- Hydrothermal circulation
- Impact crater
- List of craters on Mars
- List of quadrangles on Mars
- Martian gullies
- MOC Public Targeting Program
- Ore genesis
- Ore resources on Mars
- Polygonal patterned ground
- Planetary nomenclature
- Scalloped topography
- Water on Mars

MC-01 Mare Boreum (features)
MC-02 Diacria (features)		MC-03 Arcadia (features)	MC-04 Acidalium (features)	MC-05 Ismenius Lacus (features)		MC-06 Casius (features)	MC-07 Cebrenia (features)
MC-08 Amazonis (features)	MC-09 Tharsis (features)	MC-10 Lunae Palus (features)	MC-11 Oxia Palus (features)	MC-12 Arabia (features)	MC-13 Syrtis Major (features)	MC-14 Amenthes (features)	MC-15 Elysium (features)
MC-16 Memnonia (features)	MC-17 Phoenicis Lacus (features)	MC-18 Coprates (features)	MC-19 Margaritifer Sinus (features)	MC-20 Sinus Sabaeus (features)	MC-21 Iapygia (features)	MC-22 Mare Tyrrhenum (features)	MC-23 Aeolis (features)
MC-24 Phaethontis (features)		MC-25 Thaumasia (features)	MC-26 Argyre (features)	MC-27 Noachis (features)		MC-28 Hellas (features)	MC-29 Eridania (features)
MC-30 Mare Australe (features)
