= Scalloped topography =

Depressions in topography at mid-latitudes of Mars

Scalloped topography is common in the mid-latitudes of Mars, between 45° and 60° north and south. It is particularly prominent in the region of Utopia Planitia, in the northern hemisphere, and in the region of Peneus and Amphitrites Paterae in the southern hemisphere. Such topography consists of shallow, rimless depressions with scalloped edges, commonly referred to as "scalloped depressions" or simply "scallops". Scalloped depressions can be isolated or clustered and sometimes seem to coalesce. A typical scalloped depression displays a gentle equator-facing slope and a steeper pole-facing scarp. This topographic asymmetry is probably due to differences in insolation. Scalloped depressions are believed to form from the removal of subsurface material, possibly interstitial ice, by sublimation (direct transition of a material from the solid to the gas phase with no intermediate liquid stage). This process may still be happening at present. This topography may be of great importance for future colonization of Mars because it may point to deposits of pure ice.

A study published in Icarus, found that the landforms of scalloped topography can be made by the subsurface loss of water ice by sublimation under current Martian climate conditions over periods of tens of thousands of Mars years. Scalloped depressions are thought to begin with a small trigger like a small impact, local darkening, erosion, or cracks from thermal contraction. Cracks are common in ice-rich ground on the Earth. Their model predicts that these scalloped depression will develop when the ground has large amounts of pure ice, up to many tens of meters in depth. So, scalloped features can serve as markers for large deposits of pure ice. Ice in and around scalloped topography is not just in the pore spaces of the ground it is excess ice, probably 99% pure as was found by the Phoenix mission. The shallow Subsurface Radar (SHARAD), aboard the Mars Reconnaissance Orbiter can detect ice-rich layers only when thicker than 10–20 meters over wide areas; it has discovered ice in the region of scalloped topography.

The details on the formation of scalloped topography still being worked out. One study, published in 2016 in Icarus proposes a five step process.

1. Major changes in the planet’s tilt change the climate. This climate change causes an icy mantle to form.
2. Various conditions cause the mantle to thaw or evaporate.
3. Meltwater moves in the ground, at least to the depth of the scalloped depressions.
4. Freezing and thawing of the ice produces masses of ice (ice lenses).
5. With another tilt change the climate changes and masses of ice sublimate, resulting in scalloped depressions.

In Utopia Planitia, a series of curvilinear ridges parallel to the scarp are etched on the floor of large scalloped depressions, possibly representing different stages of scarp erosion. Recently, other researchers have advanced an idea that the ridges represent the tops of layers. Sometimes the surface around scalloped terrain or scalloped topography displays "patterned ground", characterized by a regular pattern of polygonal fractures. These patterns indicate that the surface has undergone stress, perhaps caused by subsidence, desiccation, or thermal contraction. Such patterns are common in periglacial areas on Earth. Scalloped terrains in Utopia Planitia display polygonal features of different sizes: small (about 5–10 m across) on the scarp, and larger (30–50 m across) on the surrounding terrains. These scale differences may indicate local difference in ground ice concentrations.

== Detection of underground ice ==
On November 22, 2016, NASA reported finding a large amount of underground ice in the Utopia Planitia region of Mars. The volume of water detected has been estimated to be equivalent to the volume of water in Lake Superior.

Mars – Scalloped terrain at Utopia Planitia (November 22, 2016)

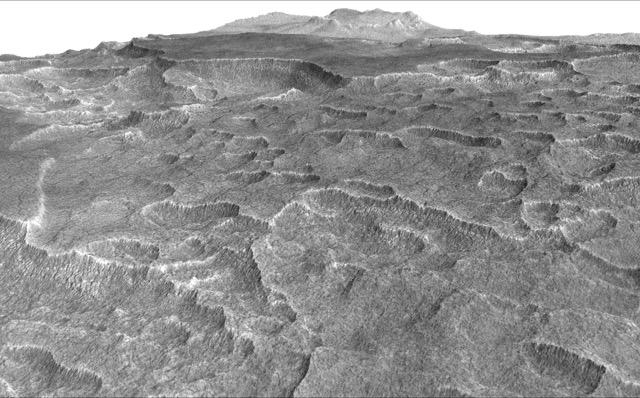
Martian terrain

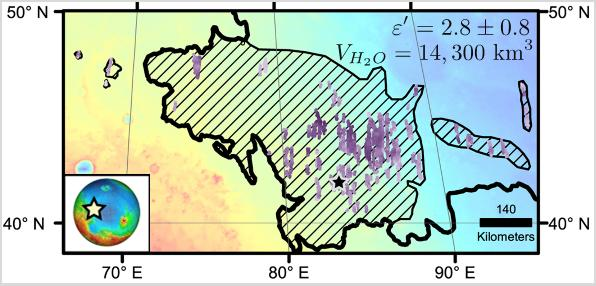
Map of terrain

The calculations for the volume of water ice in the region were based on measurements from the ground-penetrating radar instrument on Mars Reconnaissance Orbiter, called SHARAD.

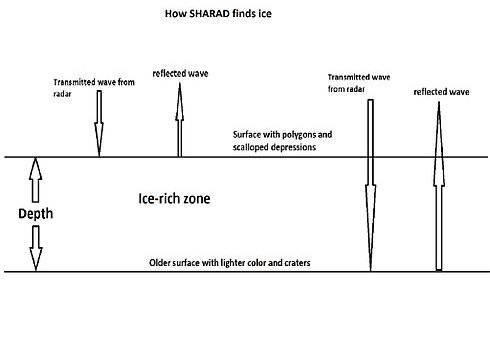
SHARAD finds ice by measuring its radar returns from the surface and from a deeper lower surface. The depth to the lower surface was found from HiRISE images of gaps in the surface.

From the data obtained from SHARAD, dielectric permittivity, or the dielectric constant was determined. That was found from the amount of penetration of the radar to a reflector at the bottom of the ice-rich layer. The depth to the reflector was found by examining high resolution photos of the location. Certain places had gaps or windows in the ice rich layer. MOLA topographic maps then told the depth. The top of the ice-rich layer displayed polygons, scalloped depressions, and exhuming craters all of which are believed to indicate ice. At the bottom of the gap was a totally different surface of a different color and full of craters; this was the reflector seen in the radar returns. The dielectric constant, averaged over the entire area, came out to be 2.8. Solid water ice would have a dielectric of 3.0–3.2. Basalt rock which is widespread on Mars would yield 8. So using a ternary diagram from a paper by Ali Bramson et al., the researchers decided the ice-rich layer was a mixture composed of 50–80% water ice, 0–30% rocky content, and 15–50% porosity.

== Gallery ==
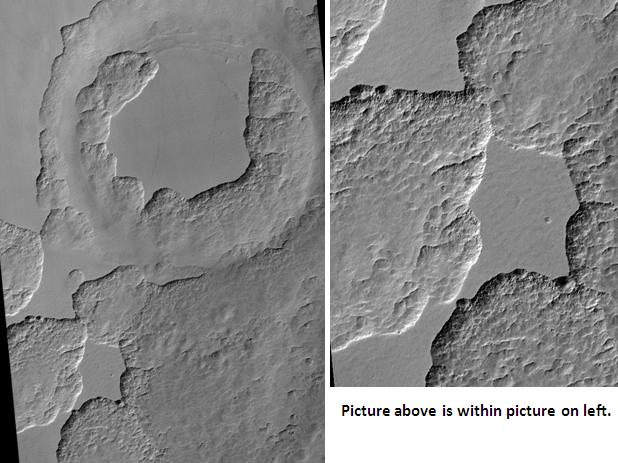
Scalloped terrain at Peneus Patera, as seen by HiRISE. Scalloped terrain is quite common in some areas of Mars. Image is from the Noachis quadrangle.

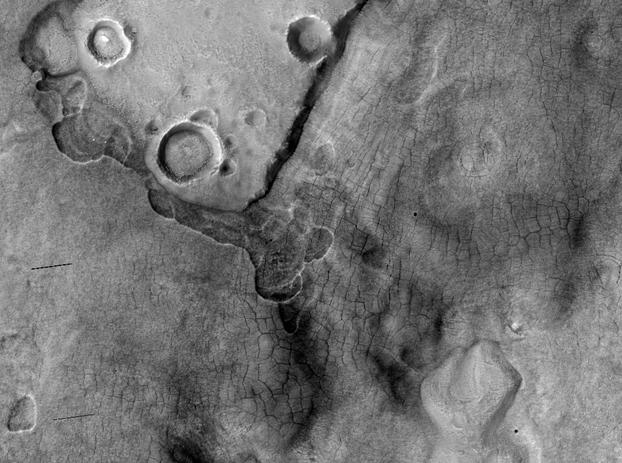
Periglacial forms in Utopia, as seen by HiRISE, showing patterned ground and scalloped topography. Image in Casius quadrangle.

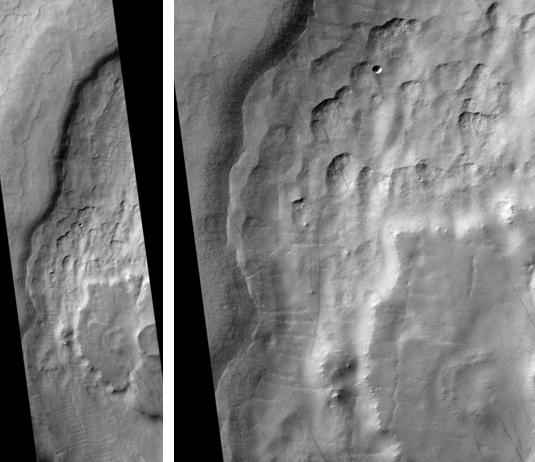
Mad Vallis, as seen by HiRISE, exhibiting scalloped terrain. Picture on right is an enlargement of part of the other picture. Image in Hellas quadrangle.

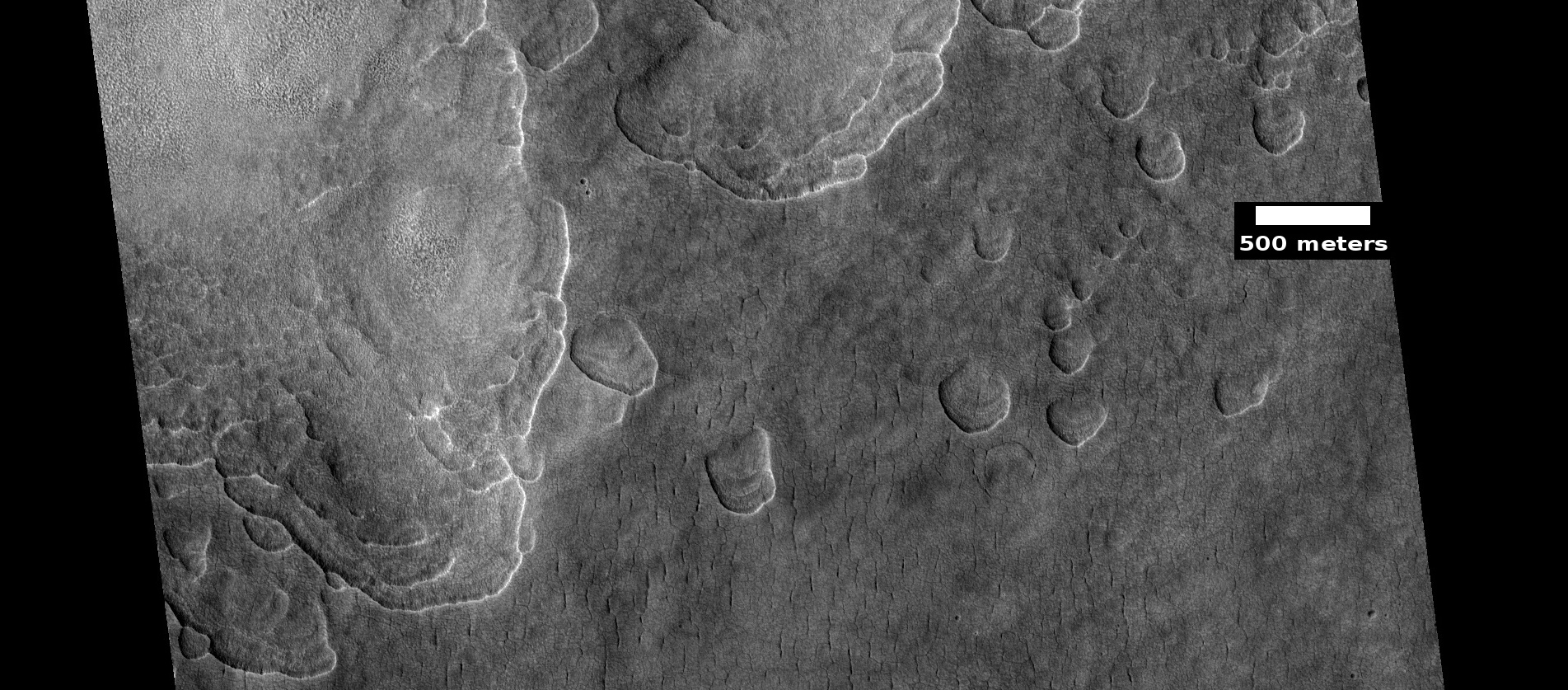
Scalloped ground, as seen by HiRISE under HiWish program.

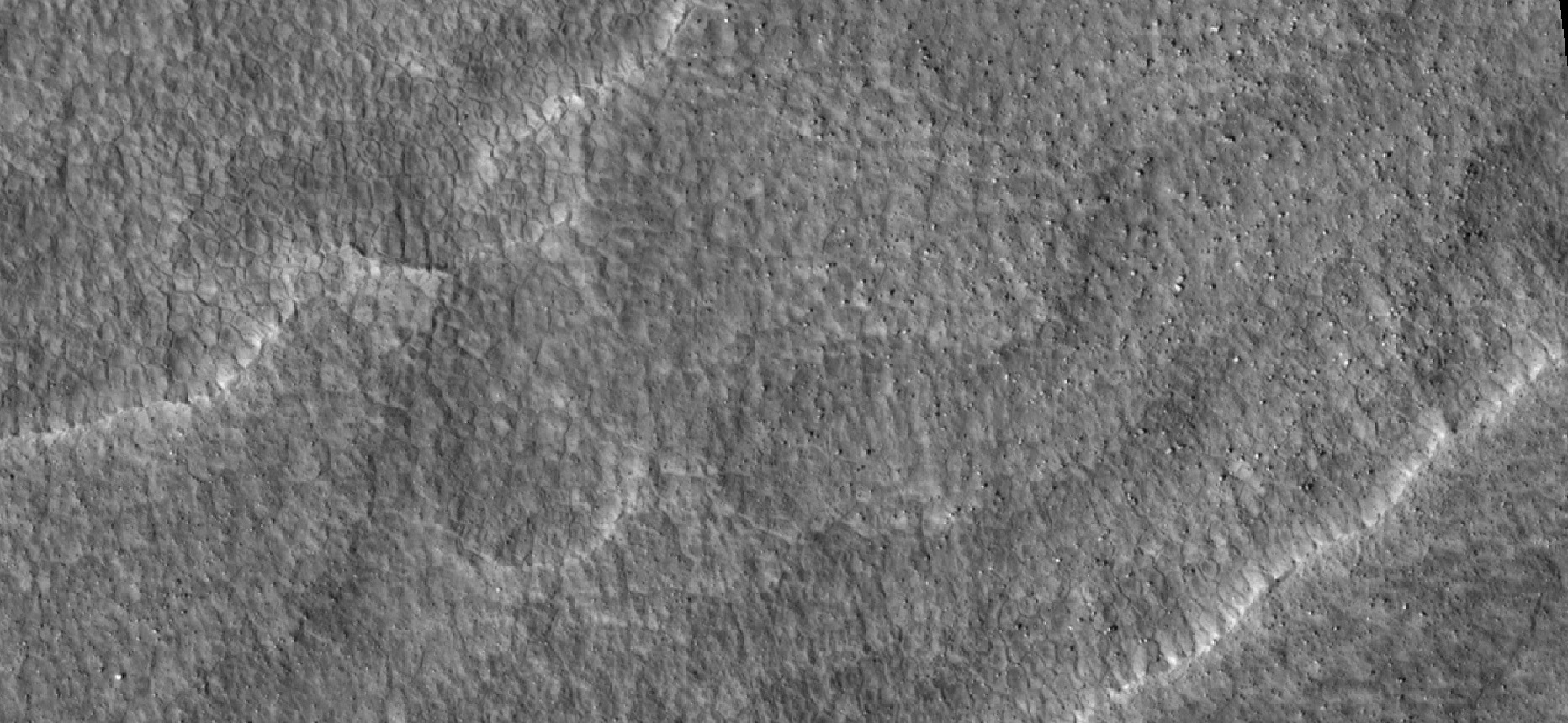
Close up of scalloped ground, as seen by HiRISE under HiWish program. Surface is divided into polygons; these forms are common where ground freezes and thaws. Note: this is an enlargement of a previous image.

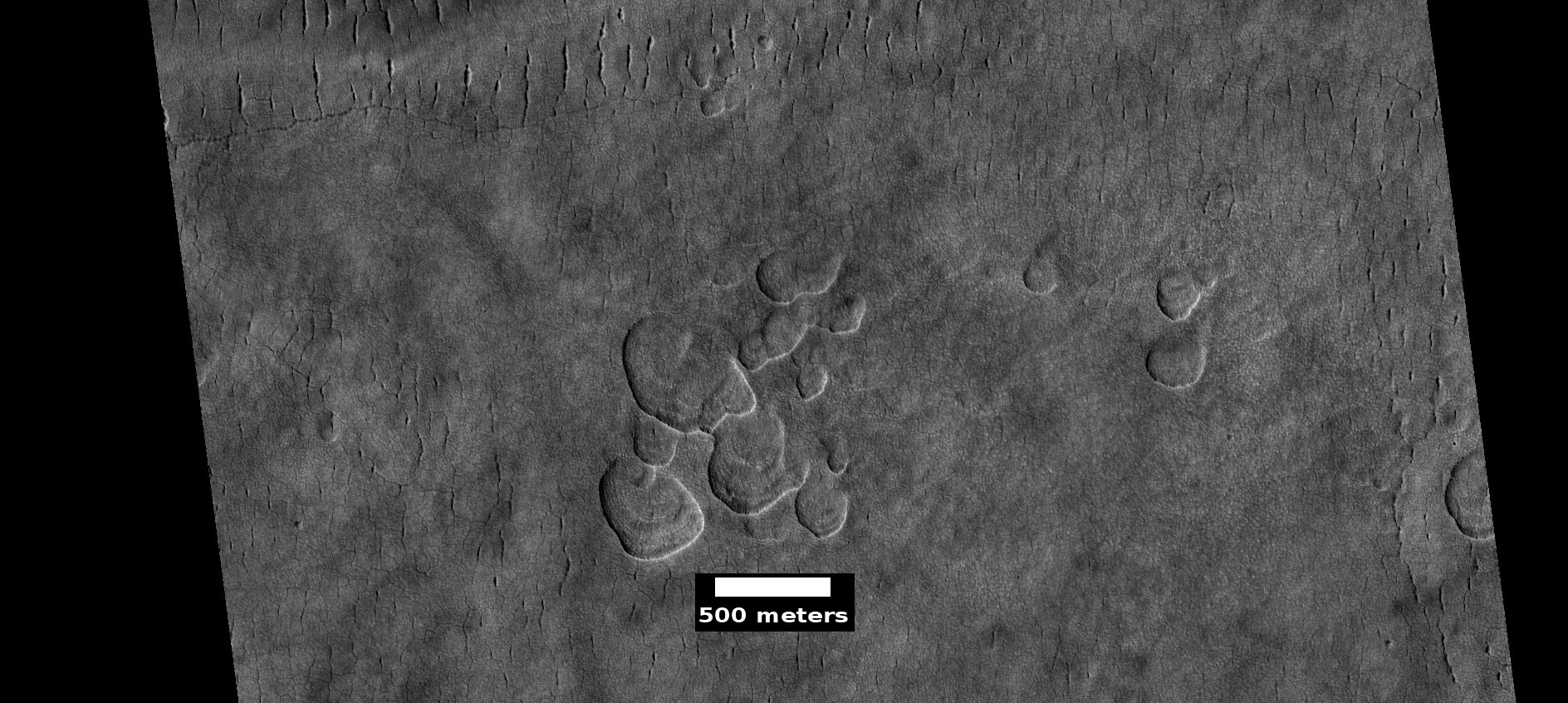
Scalloped ground, as seen by HiRISE under HiWish program.

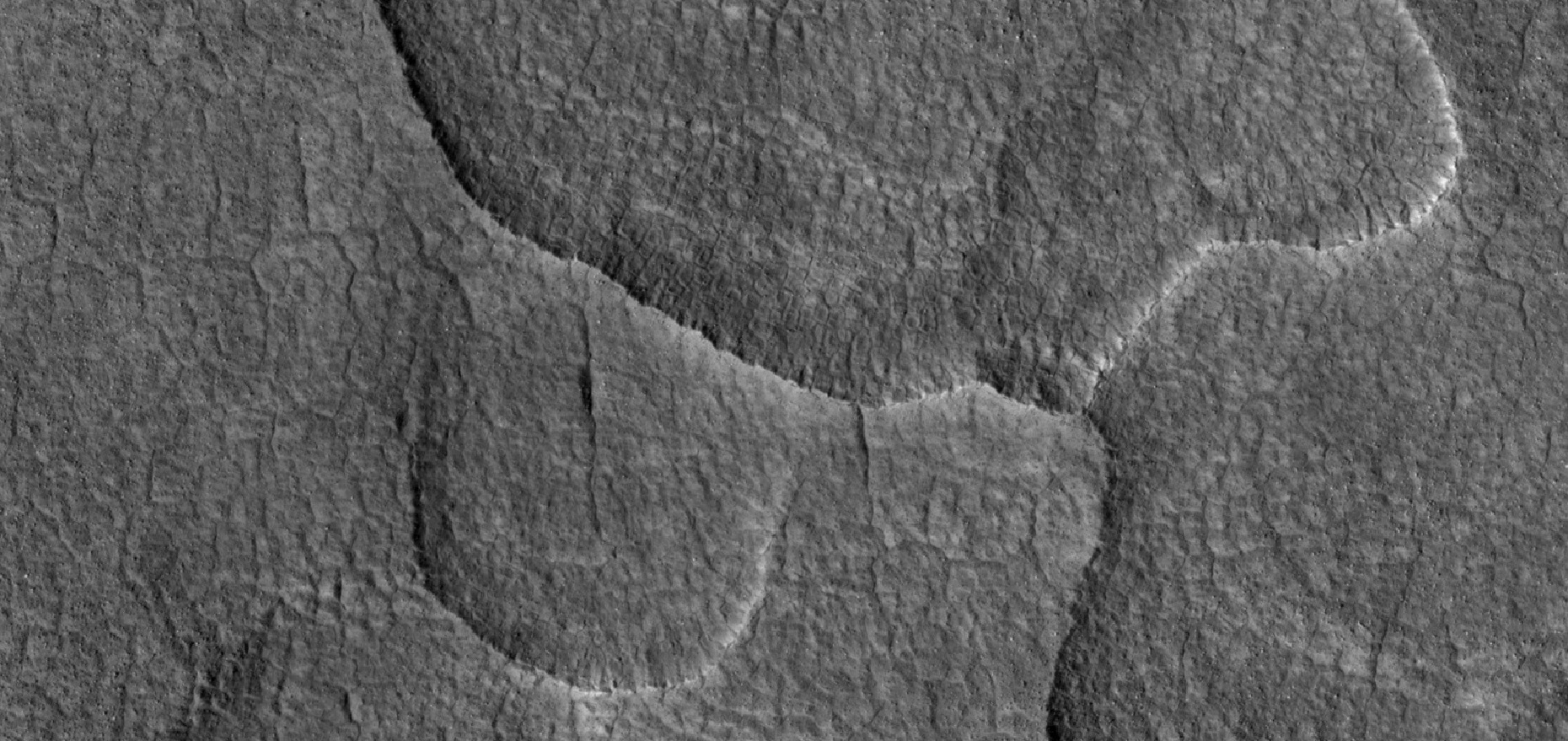
Close-up of scalloped ground, as seen by HiRISE under HiWish program. Surface is divided into polygons; these forms are common where ground freezes and thaws. Note: this is an enlargement of a previous image.

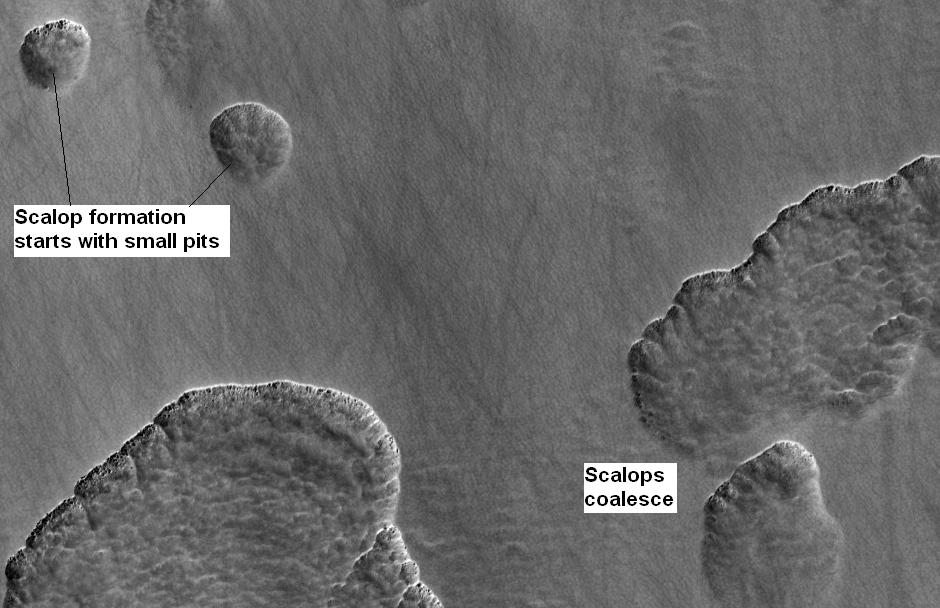
Stages in scallop formation, as seen by HiRISE. Location is Hellas quadrangle.

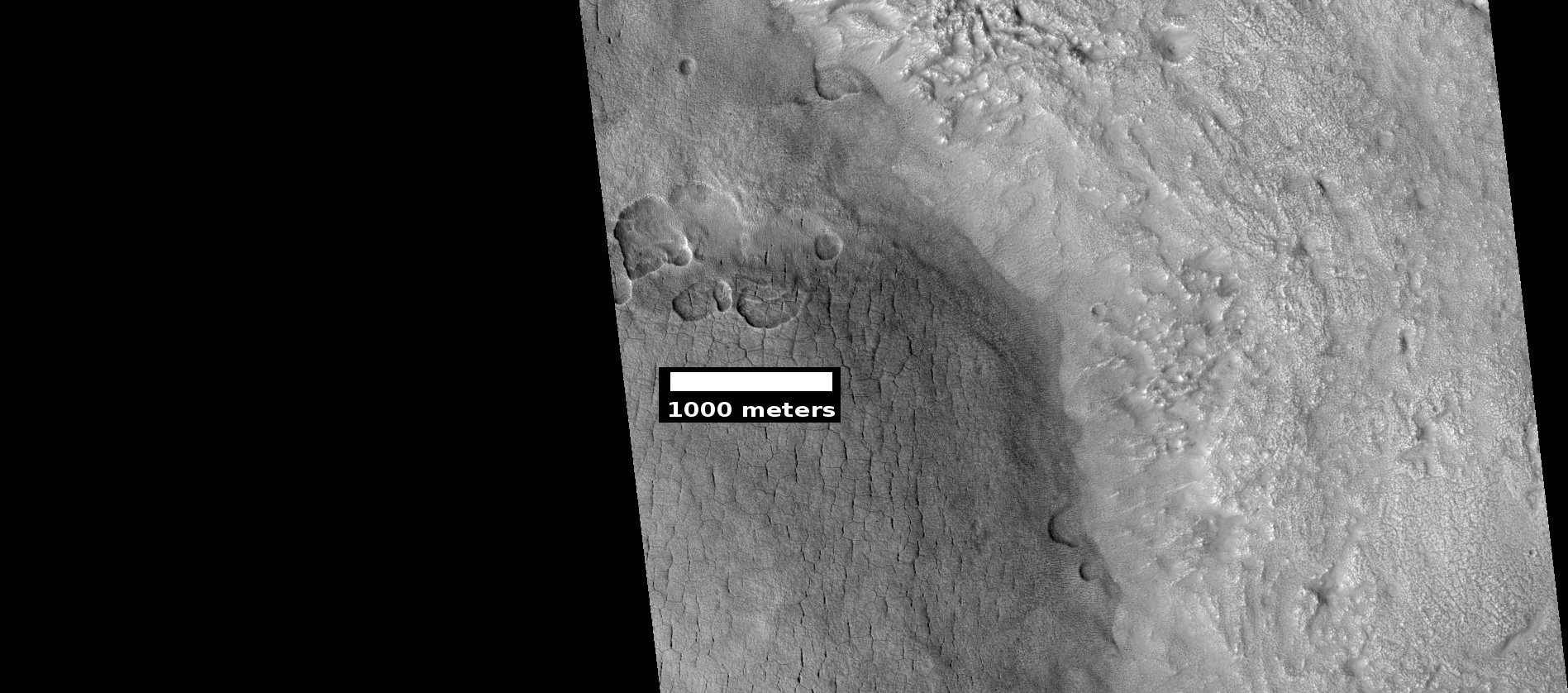
Periglacial Scallops and polygons, as seen by HiRISE under HiWish program.

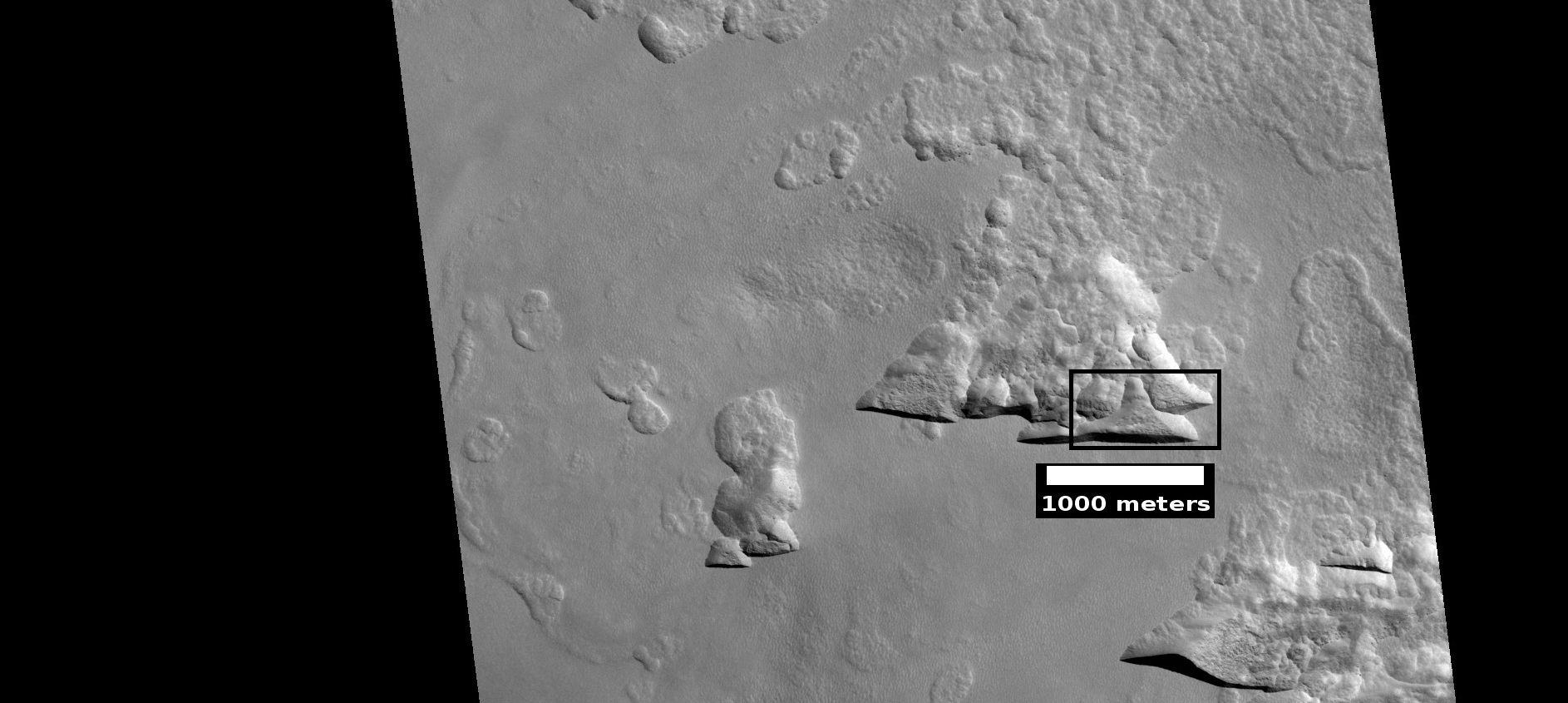
Possible variation of scalloped terrain in depressions with straight southern walls, as seen by HiRISE under HiWish program. Box indicates part enlarged in images below. Image located in Diacria quadrangle in Milankovic crater.

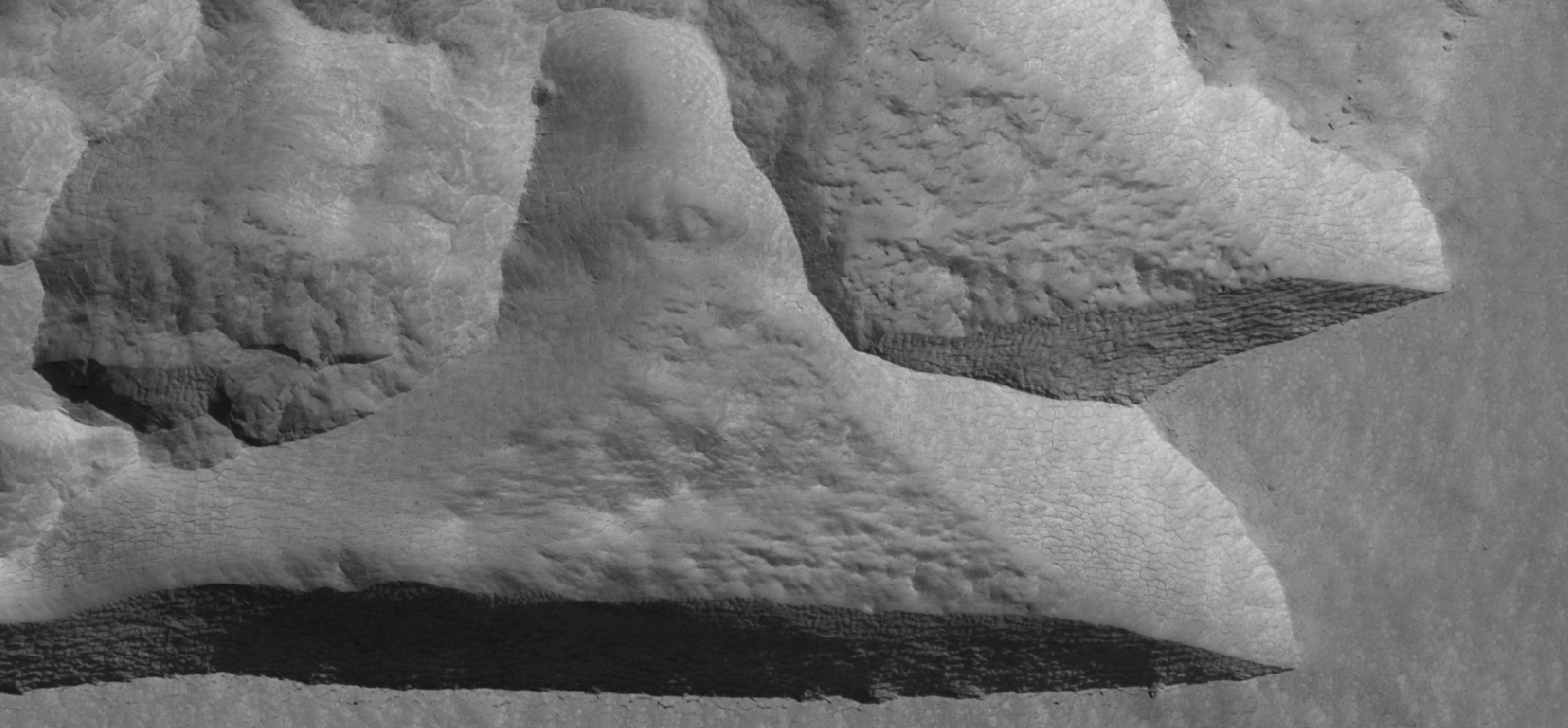
Enlargement of above image of straight walled depression, as seen by HiRISE under HiWish program. Note that the southern wall is dark compared to the northern wall.

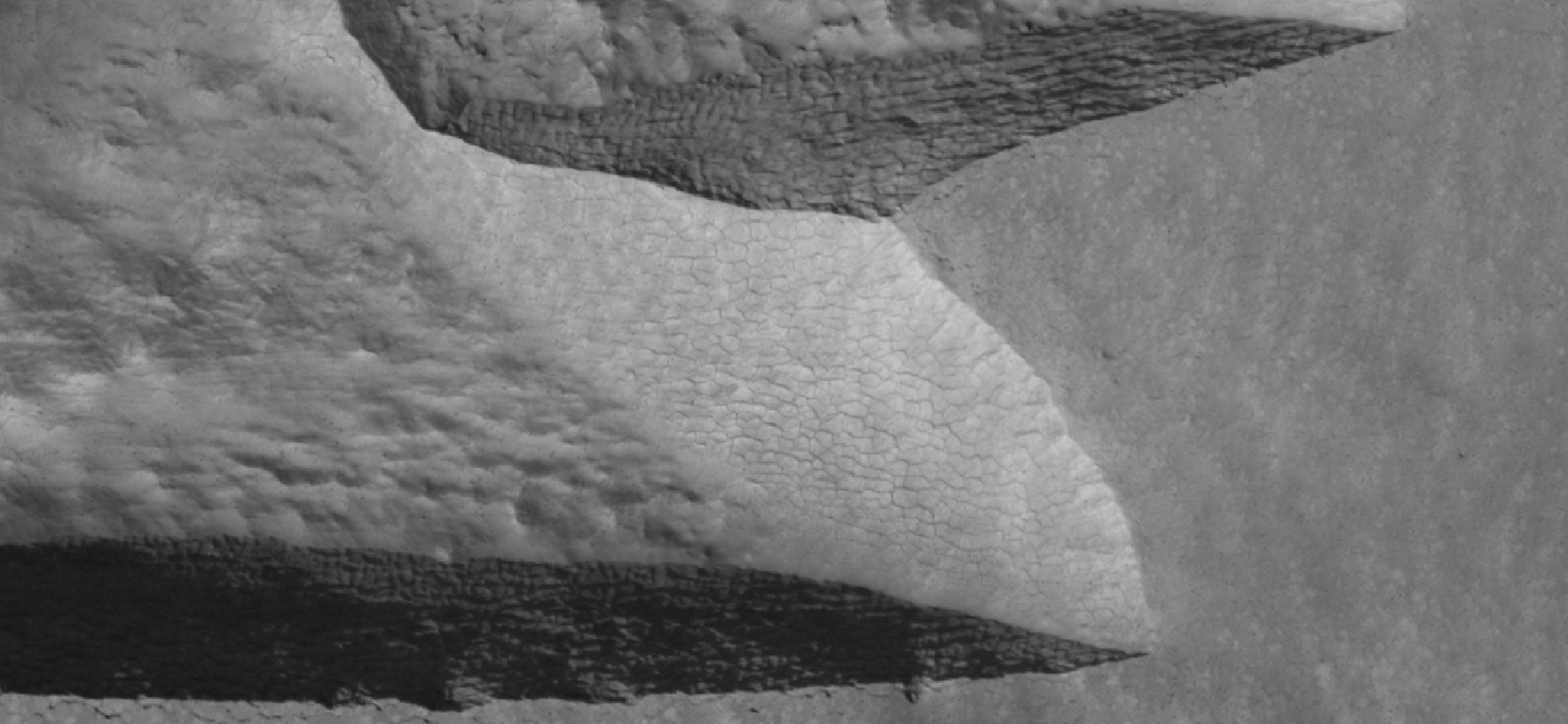
Further enlargement of above image, as seen by HiRISE under HiWish program.
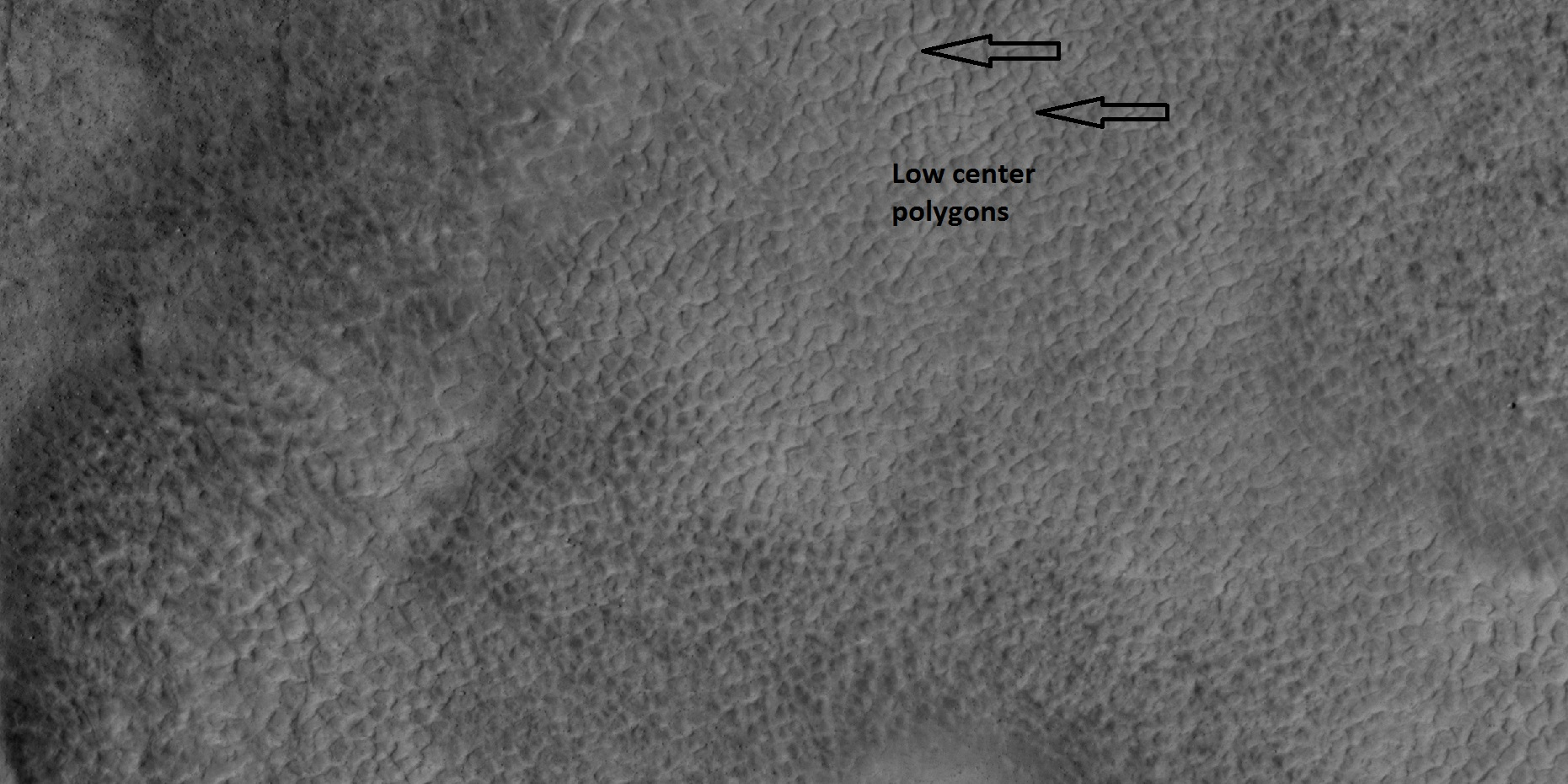
Low center polygons, shown with arrows, as seen by HiRISE under HiWish program Image was enlarged with HiView.

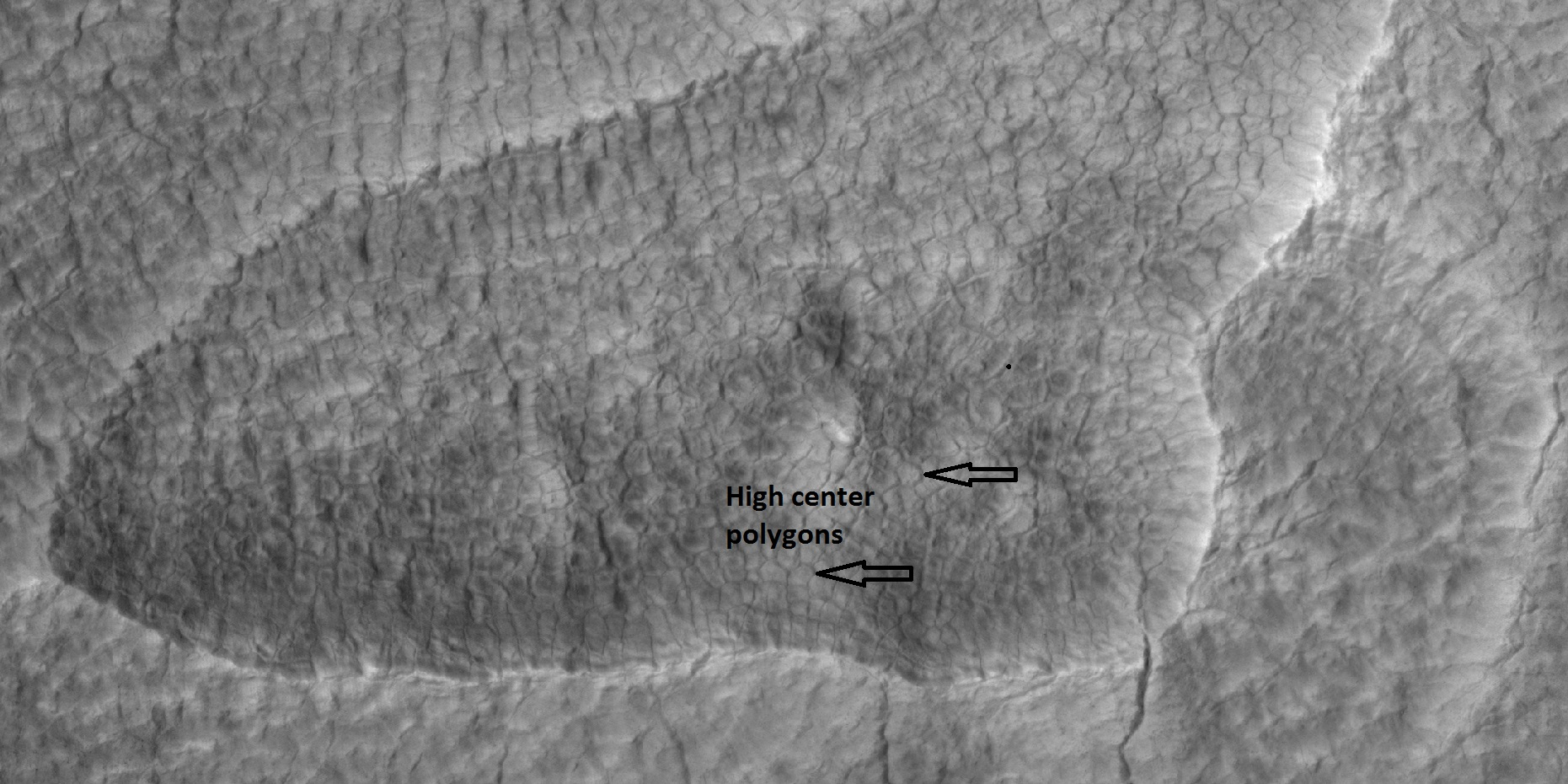
High center polygons, shown with arrows, as seen by HiRISE under HiWish program. Image enlarged with HiView.

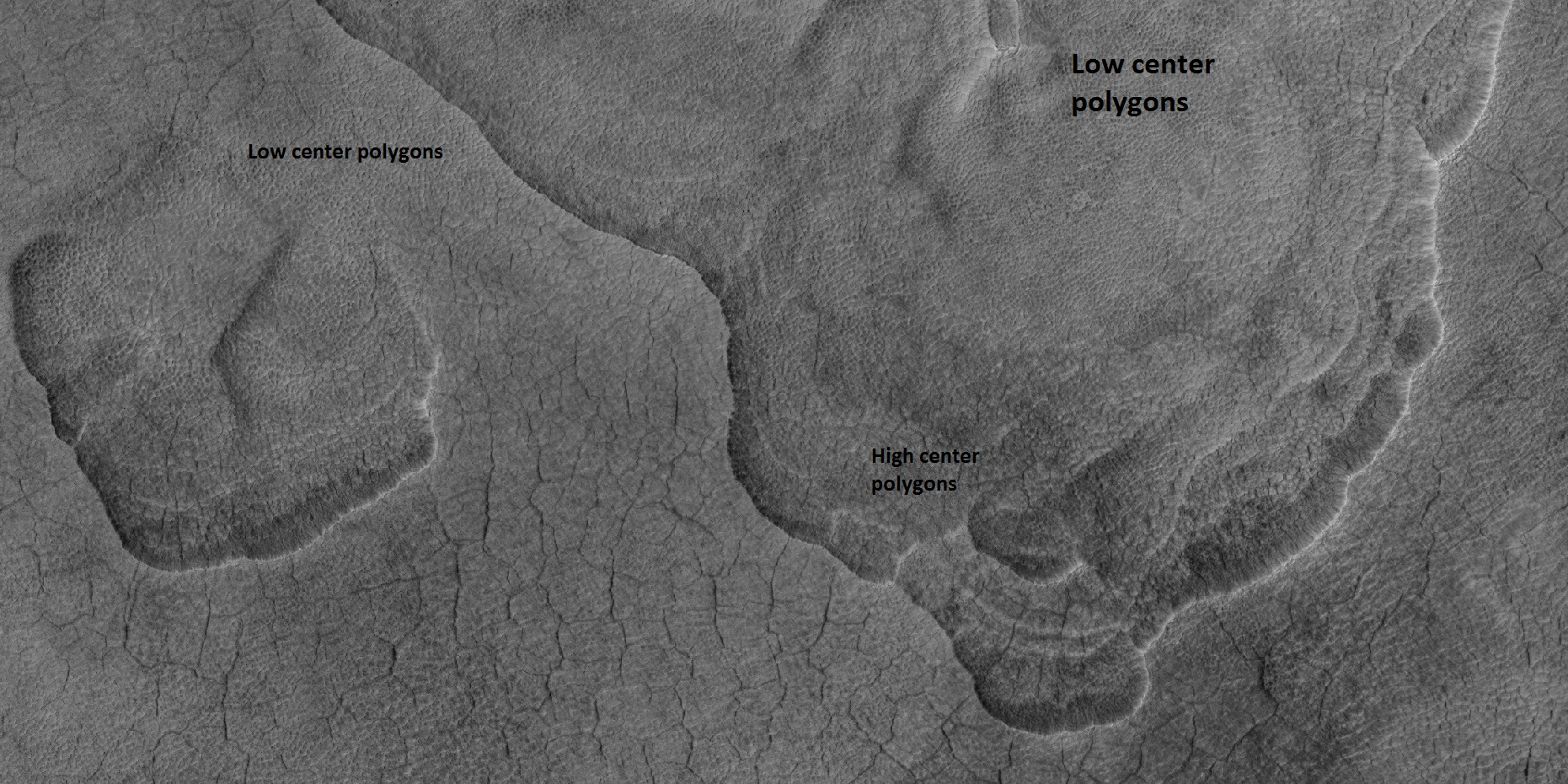
Scalloped terrain labeled with both low center polygons and high center polygons, as seen by HiRISE under HiWish program Image enlarged with HiView.

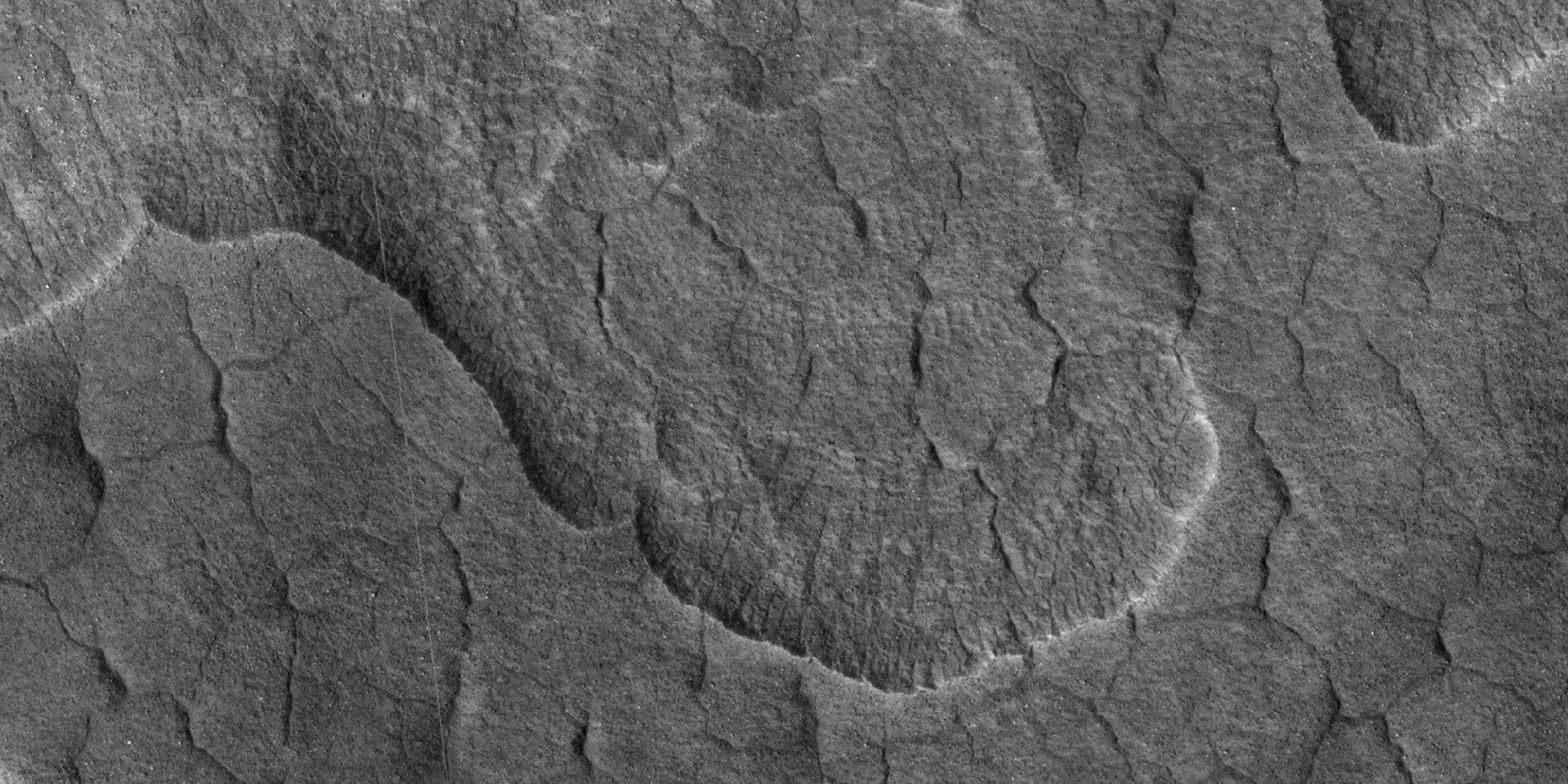
Scalloped terrain, as seen by HiRISE under HiWish program The location is the Casius quadrangle.
