= Composition of Mars =

Branch of the geology of Mars

The composition of Mars covers the branch of the geology of Mars that describes the make-up of the planet Mars.

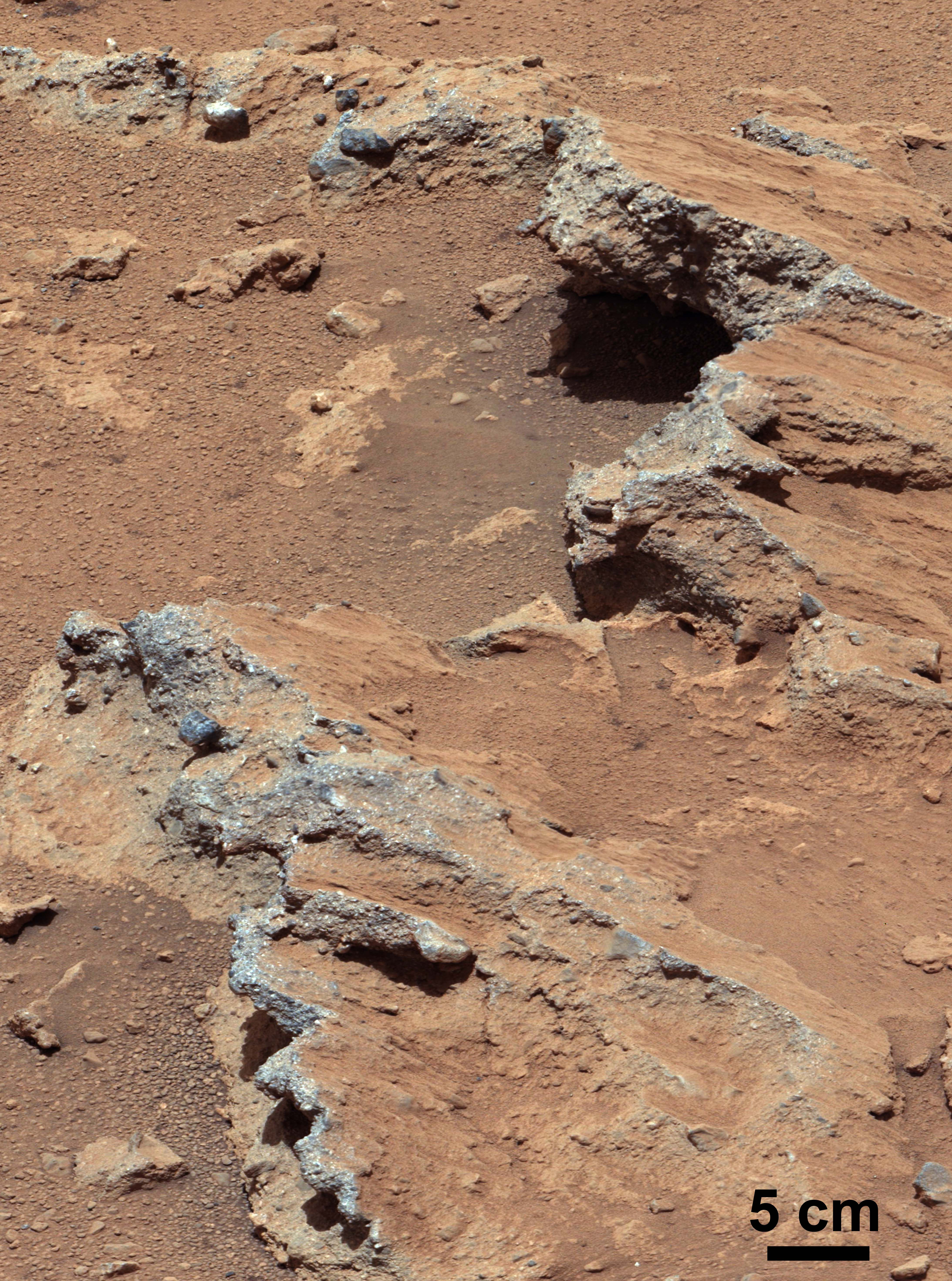
"Hottah" rock outcrop on Mars – ancient streambed viewed by the Curiosity Rover (September 12, 2012, white balanced) (raw, close-up, 3-D version). Abundant iron compounds are responsible for the bright brownish-red colour of the martian soil.

== Elemental composition ==
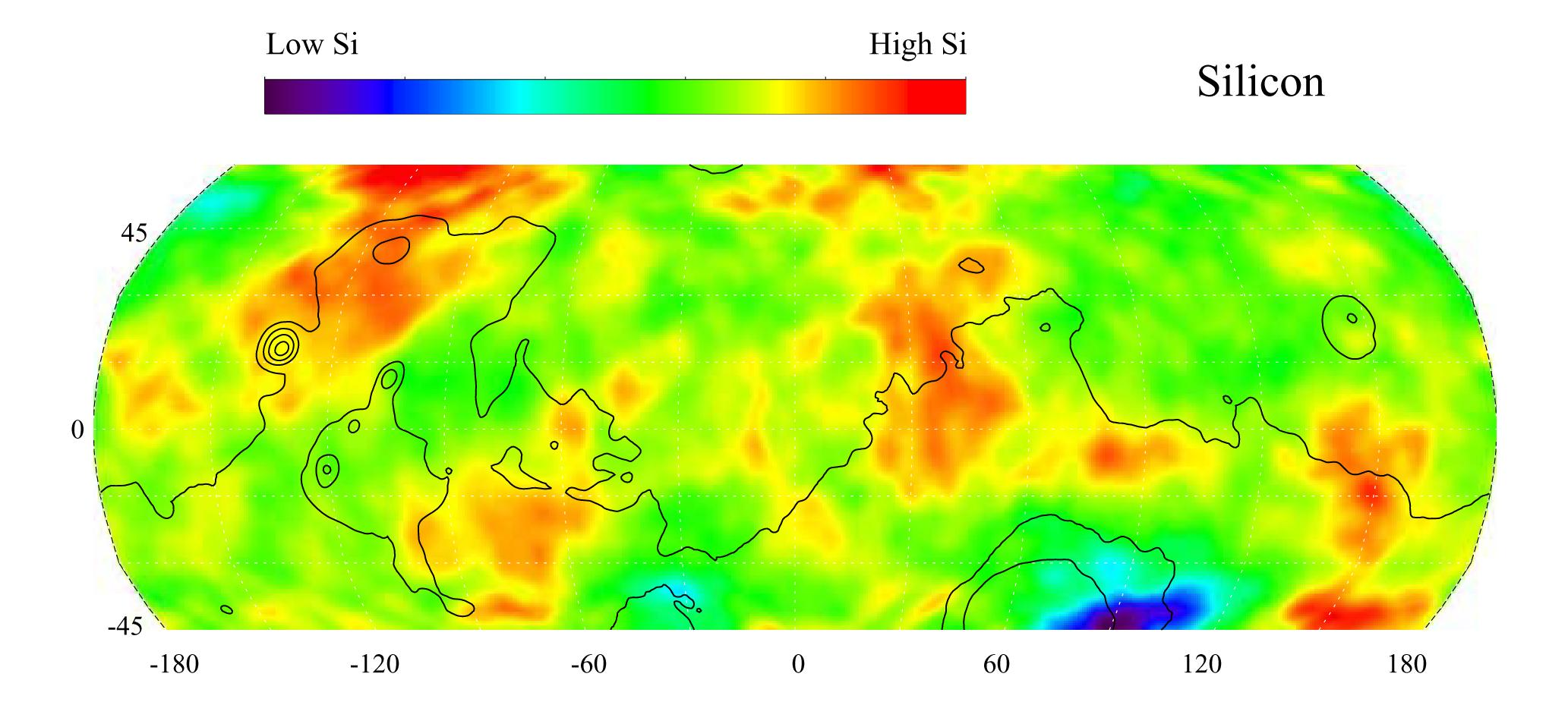
Elemental abundances can be determined remotely by orbiting spacecraft. This map shows the surface concentration (by weight percent) of the element silicon based on data from the Gamma Ray Spectrometer (GRS) Suite on the Mars Odyssey spacecraft. Similar maps exist for a number of other elements.

Mars is differentiated, which—for a terrestrial planet—implies that it has a central core made up of high density matter (mainly metallic iron and nickel) surrounded by a less dense, silicate mantle and crust. Like Earth, Mars appears to have a molten iron core, or at least a molten outer core. However, there does not appear to be convection in the mantle. Presently, Mars shows little geological activity.

The elemental composition of Mars is different from Earth's in several significant ways. First, Martian meteorite analysis suggests that the planet's mantle is about twice as rich in iron as the Earth's mantle. The planet's distinctive red color is due to iron oxides on its surface. Second, its core is richer in sulphur. Third, the Martian mantle is richer in potassium and phosphorus than Earth's and fourth, the Martian crust contains a higher percentage of volatile elements such as sulphur and chlorine than the Earth's crust does. Many of these conclusions are supported by in situ analyses of rocks and soils on the Martian surface.

Much of what we know about the elemental composition of Mars comes from orbiting spacecraft and landers. (See Exploration of Mars for list.) Most of these spacecraft carry spectrometers and other instruments to measure the surface composition of Mars by either remote sensing from orbit or in situ analyses on the surface. We also have many actual samples of Mars in the form of meteorites that have made their way to Earth. Martian meteorites (often called SNC's, for Shergottites, Nakhlites, and Chassignites—the groups of meteorites first shown to have a martian origin) provide data on the chemical composition of Mars's crust and interior that would not otherwise be available except through a sample return mission.

The most abundant gasses in the atmosphere of Mars by volume (Curiosity rover, October 2012).

Based on these data sources, scientists think that the most abundant chemical elements in the Martian crust are silicon, oxygen, iron, magnesium, aluminium, calcium, and potassium. These elements are major components of the minerals comprising igneous rocks. The elements titanium, chromium, manganese, sulfur, phosphorus, sodium, and chlorine are less abundant but are still important components of many accessory minerals in rocks and of secondary minerals (weathering products) in the dust and soils (the regolith). On September 5, 2017, scientists reported that the Curiosity rover detected boron, an essential ingredient for life on Earth, on the planet Mars. Such a finding, along with previous discoveries that water may have been present on ancient Mars, further supports the possible early habitability of Gale Crater on Mars.

Hydrogen is present as water (H_{2}O) ice and in hydrated minerals. Carbon occurs as carbon dioxide (CO_{2}) in the atmosphere and sometimes as dry ice at the poles. An unknown amount of carbon is also stored in carbonates. Molecular nitrogen (N_{2}) makes up 2.7 percent of the atmosphere. As far as we know, organic compounds are absent except for a trace of methane detected in the atmosphere. On 16 December 2014, NASA reported the Curiosity rover detected a "tenfold spike", likely localized, in the amount of methane in the Martian atmosphere. Sample measurements taken "a dozen times over 20 months" showed increases in late 2013 and early 2014, averaging "7 parts of methane per billion in the atmosphere." Before and after that, readings averaged around one-tenth that level.

On 25 October 2023, scientists, helped by information from the InSight lander, reported that the planet Mars has a radioactive magma ocean under its crust.

== Mineralogy and petrology ==
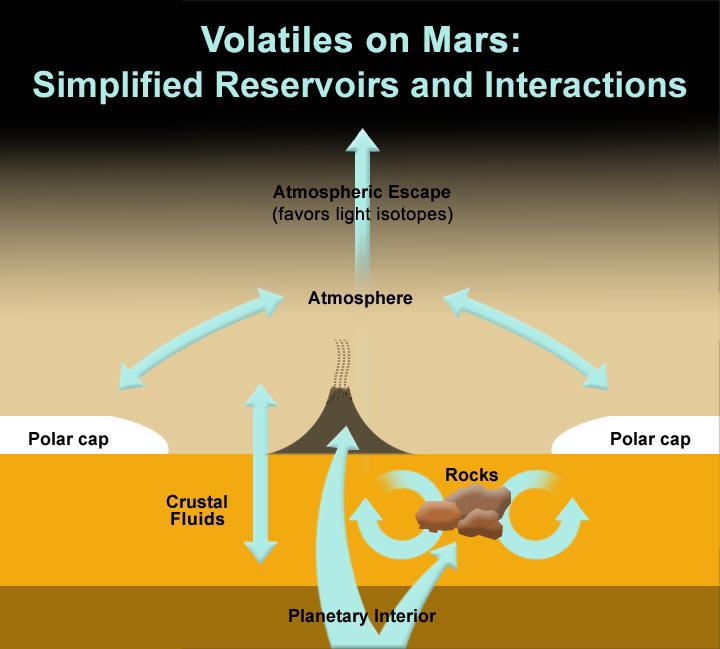
Planet Mars volatile gases (Curiosity rover, October 2012).

Mars is fundamentally an igneous planet. Rocks on the surface and in the crust consist predominantly of minerals that crystallize from magma. Most of our current knowledge about the mineral composition of Mars comes from spectroscopic data from orbiting spacecraft, in situ analyses of rocks and soils from six landing sites, and study of the Martian meteorites. Spectrometers currently in orbit include THEMIS (Mars Odyssey), OMEGA (Mars Express), and CRISM (Mars Reconnaissance Orbiter). The two Mars exploration rovers each carry an Alpha Particle X-ray Spectrometer (APXS), a thermal emission spectrometer (Mini-TES), and Mössbauer spectrometer to identify minerals on the surface.

On October 17, 2012, the Curiosity rover on the planet Mars at "Rocknest" performed the first X-ray diffraction analysis of Martian soil. The results from the rover's CheMin analyzer revealed the presence of several minerals, including feldspar, pyroxenes and olivine, and suggested that the Martian soil in the sample was similar to the "weathered basaltic soils" of Hawaiian volcanoes.

=== Primary rocks and minerals ===
The dark areas of Mars are characterised by the mafic rock-forming minerals olivine, pyroxene, and plagioclase feldspar. These minerals are the primary constituents of basalt, a dark volcanic rock that also makes up the Earth's oceanic crust and the lunar maria.

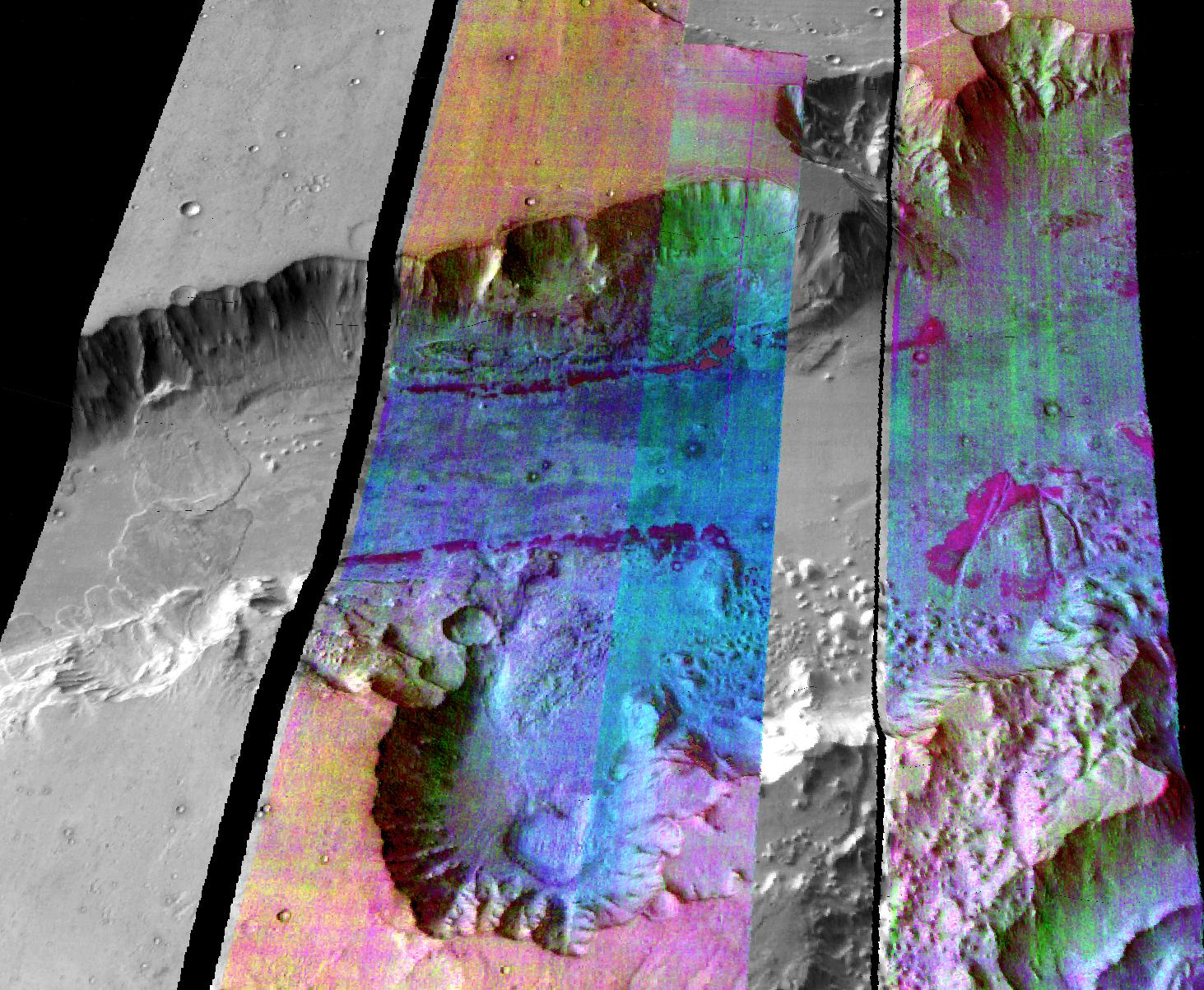
Ared Andromeda THEMIS colour image of olivine basalts in the Valles Marineris. Layers rich in olivine appear dark green

The mineral olivine occurs all over the planet, but some of the largest concentrations are in Nili Fossae, an area containing Noachian-aged rocks. Another large olivine-rich outcrop is in Ganges Chasma, an eastern side chasm of Valles Marineris (pictured). Olivine weathers rapidly into clay minerals in the presence of liquid water. Therefore, areas with large outcroppings of olivine-bearing rock indicate that liquid water has not been abundant since the rocks formed.

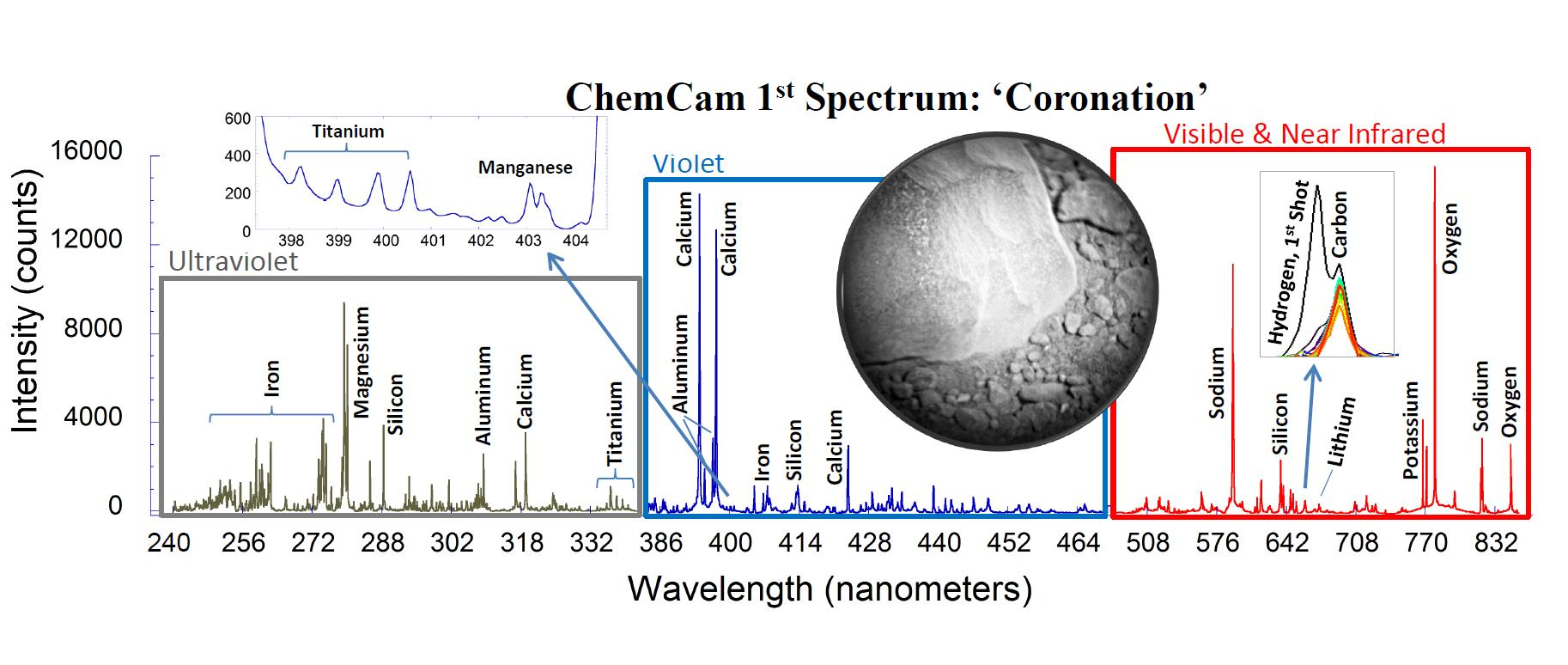
First Laser Spectrum of chemical elements from ChemCam on the Curiosity Rover ("Coronation" rock, August 19, 2012).

Pyroxene minerals are also widespread across the surface. Both low-calcium (ortho-) and high-calcium (clino-) pyroxenes are present, with the high-calcium varieties associated with younger volcanic shields and the low-calcium forms (enstatite) more common in the old highland terrain. Because enstatite melts at a higher temperature than its high-calcium cousin, some researchers have argued that its presence in the highlands indicates that older magmas on Mars had higher temperatures than younger ones.

Between 1997 and 2006, the Thermal Emission Spectrometer (TES) on the Mars Global Surveyor (MGS) spacecraft mapped the global mineral composition of the planet. TES identified two global-scale volcanic units on Mars. Surface Type 1 (ST1) characterises the Noachian-aged highlands and consists of unaltered plagioclase- and clinopyroxene-rich basalts. Surface Type 2 (ST2) is common in the younger plains north of the dichotomy boundary and is more silica rich than ST1.

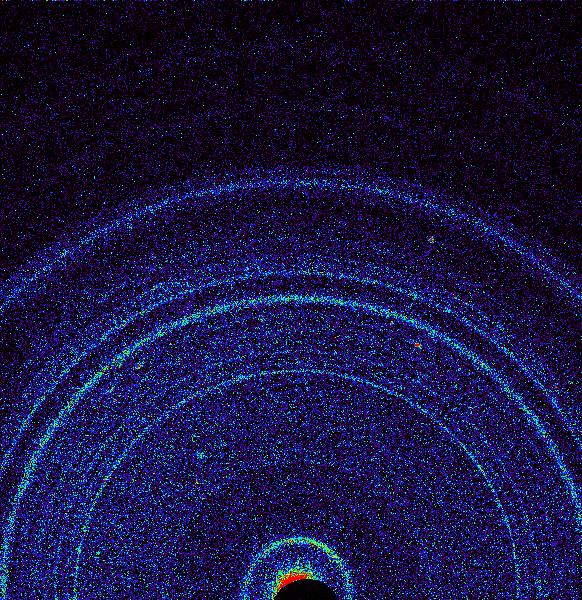
First X-ray diffraction view of Martian soil – CheMin analysis reveals feldspar, pyroxenes, olivine and more (Curiosity rover at "Rocknest", October 17, 2012).

The lavas of ST2 have been interpreted as andesites or basaltic andesites, indicating the lavas in the northern plains originated from more chemically evolved, volatile-rich magmas. (See Igneous differentiation and Fractional crystallization.) However, other researchers have suggested that ST2 represents weathered basalts with thin coatings of silica glass or other secondary minerals that formed through interaction with water- or ice-bearing materials.

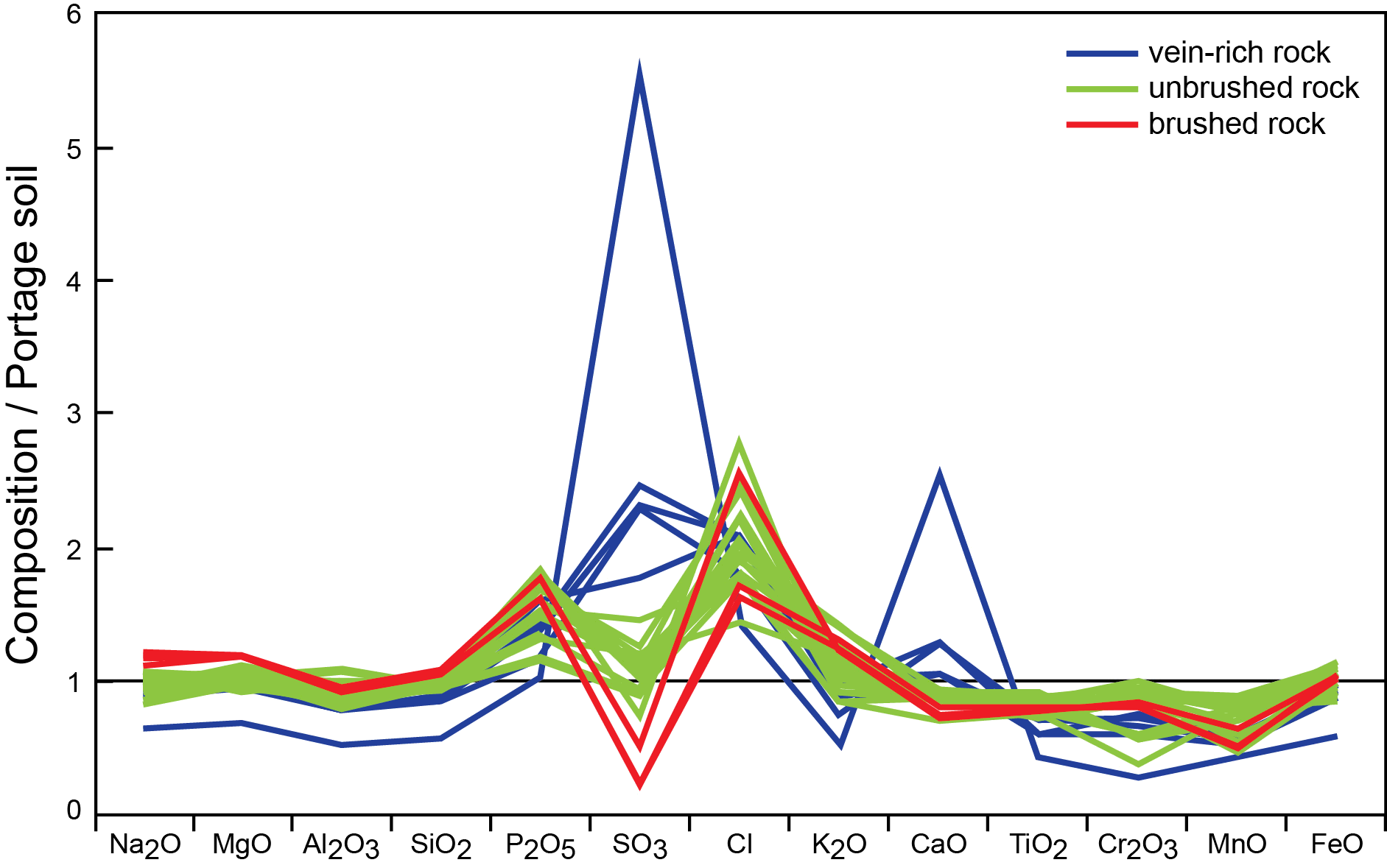
Composition of "Yellowknife Bay" rocks – rock veins are higher in calcium and sulfur than "Portage" soil – APXS results – Curiosity rover (March, 2013).

True intermediate and felsic rocks are present on Mars, but exposures are uncommon. Both TES and the Thermal Emission Imaging System (THEMIS) on the Mars Odyssey spacecraft have identified high-silica rocks in Syrtis Major and near the southwestern rim of the crater Antoniadi. The rocks have spectra resembling quartz-rich dacites and granitoids, suggesting that at least some parts of the Martian crust may have a diversity of igneous rocks similar to Earth's. Some geophysical evidence suggests that the bulk of the Martian crust may actually consist of basaltic andesite or andesite. The andesitic crust is hidden by overlying basaltic lavas that dominate the surface composition but are volumetrically minor.

Rocks studied by Spirit rover in Gusev crater can be classified in different ways. The amounts and types of minerals make the rocks primitive basalts—also called picritic basalts. The rocks are similar to ancient terrestrial rocks called basaltic komatiites. Rocks of the plains also resemble the basaltic shergottites, meteorites which came from Mars. One classification system compares the amount of alkali elements to the amount of silica on a graph; in this system, Gusev plains rocks lie near the junction of basalt, picrobasalt, and tephrite. The Irvine-Barager classification calls them basalts.

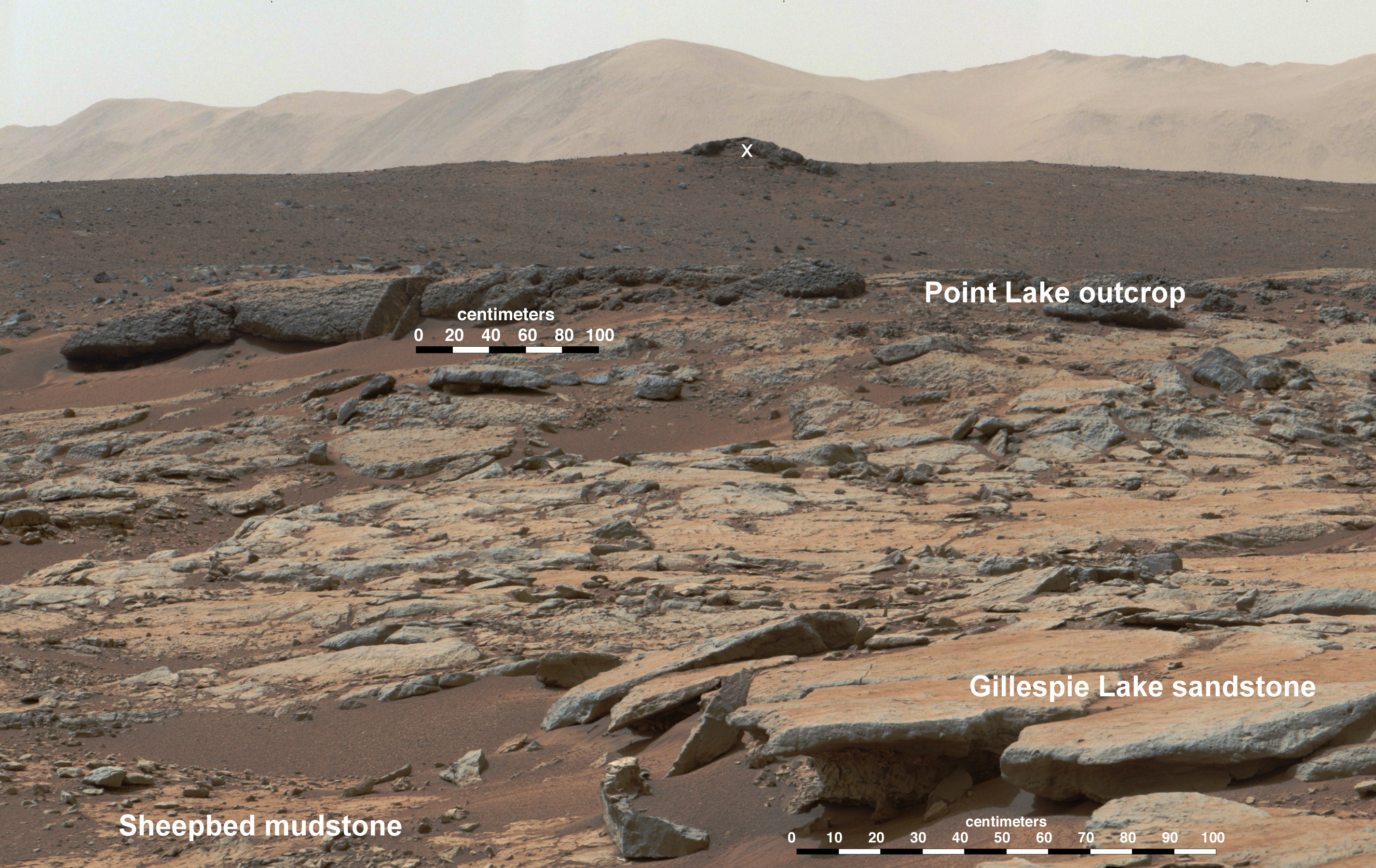
Curiosity rover – view of "Sheepbed" mudstone (lower left) and surroundings (February 14, 2013).

On March 18, 2013, NASA reported evidence from instruments on the Curiosity rover of mineral hydration, likely hydrated calcium sulfate, in several rock samples including the broken fragments of "Tintina" rock and "Sutton Inlier" rock as well as in veins and nodules in other rocks like "Knorr" rock and "Wernicke" rock. Analysis using the rover's DAN instrument provided evidence of subsurface water, amounting to as much as 4% water content, down to a depth of 60 cm (2.0 ft), in the rover's traverse from the Bradbury Landing site to the Yellowknife Bay area in the Glenelg terrain.

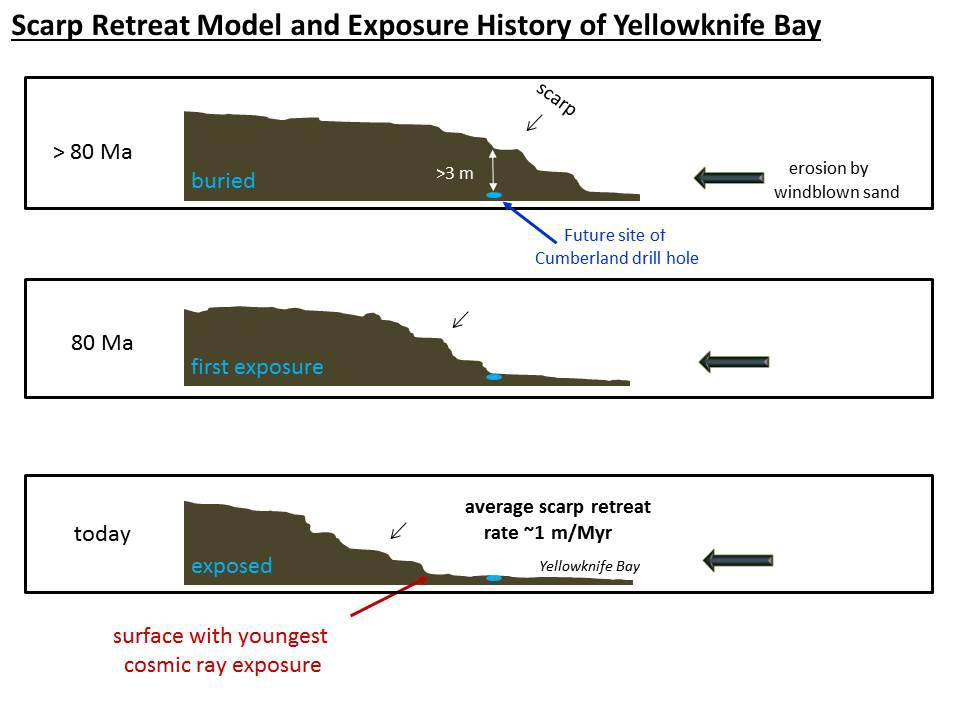
Scarp retreat by windblown sand over time on Mars (Yellowknife Bay, December 9, 2013).

In the journal Science from September 2013, researchers described a different type of rock called "Jake M" or "Jake Matijevic (rock),” It was the first rock analyzed by the Alpha Particle X-ray Spectrometer instrument on the Curiosity rover, and it was different from other known Martian igneous rocks as it is alkaline (>15% normative nepheline) and relatively fractionated. Jake M is similar to terrestrial mugearites, a rock type typically found at ocean islands and continental rifts. Jake M's discovery may mean that alkaline magmas may be more common on Mars than on Earth and that Curiosity could encounter even more fractionated alkaline rocks (for example, phonolites and trachytes).

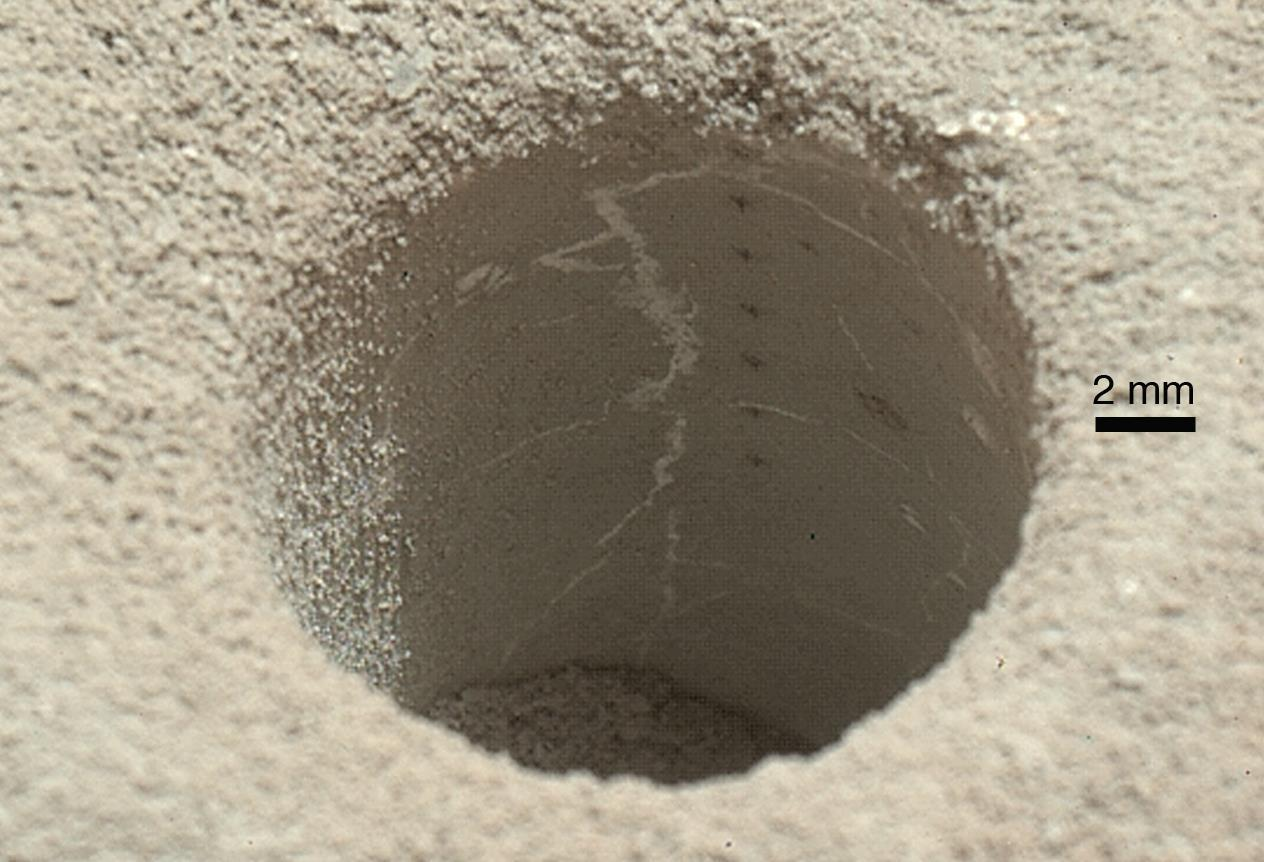
Hole (1.6 cm or 0.63 in) drilled into "John Klein" mudstone.

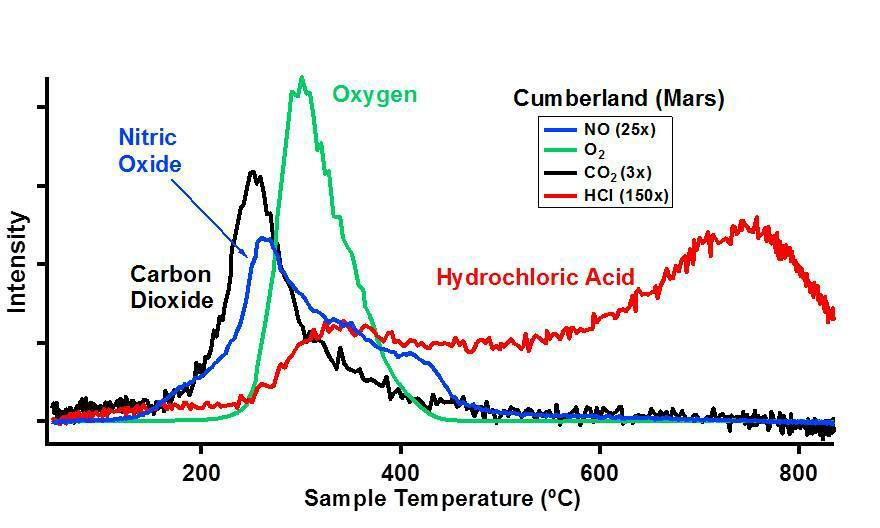
Spectral Analysis (SAM) of "Cumberland" mudstone.

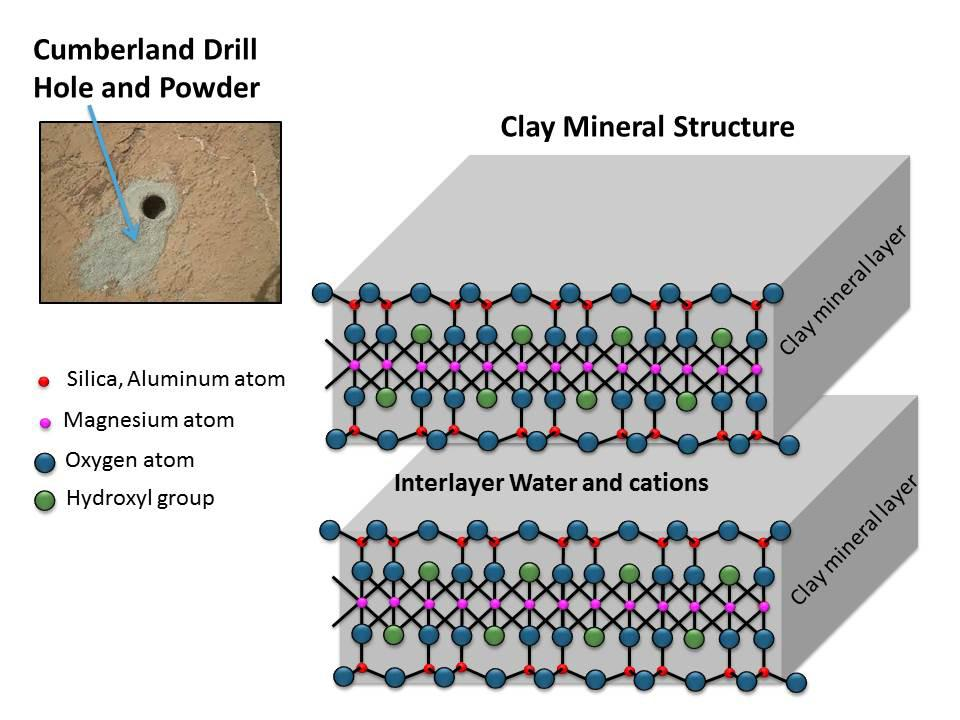
Clay mineral structure of mudstone.

The Curiosity rover examines mudstone near Yellowknife Bay on Mars (May 2013).

On December 9, 2013, NASA researchers described, in a series of six articles in the journal Science, many new discoveries from the Curiosity rover. Possible organics were found that could not be explained by contamination. Although the organic carbon was probably from Mars, it can all be explained by dust and meteorites that have landed on the planet. Because much of the carbon was released at a relatively low temperature in Curiosity's Sample Analysis at Mars (SAM) instrument package, it probably did not come from carbonates in the sample. The carbon could be from organisms, but this has not been proven. This organic-bearing material was obtained by drilling 5 centimeters deep in a site called Yellowknife Bay into a rock called “Sheepbed mudstone”. The samples were named John Klein and Cumberland. Microbes could be living on Mars by obtaining energy from chemical imbalances between minerals in a process called chemolithotrophy which means “eating rock.” However, in this process only a very tiny amount of carbon is involved — much less than was found at Yellowknife Bay.

Using SAM's mass spectrometer, scientists measured isotopes of helium, neon, and argon that cosmic rays produce as they go through rock. The fewer of these isotopes they find, the more recently the rock has been exposed near the surface. The 4-billion-year-old lakebed rock drilled by Curiosity was uncovered between 30 million and 110 million years ago by winds which sandblasted away 2 meters of overlying rock. Next, they hope to find a site tens of millions of years younger by drilling close to an overhanging outcrop.

The absorbed dose and dose equivalent from galactic cosmic rays and solar energetic particles on the Martian surface for ~300 days of observations during the current solar maximum was measured. These measurements are necessary for human missions to the surface of Mars, to provide microbial survival times of any possible extant or past life, and to determine how long potential organic biosignatures can be preserved. This study estimates that a few meters drill is necessary to access possible biomolecules. The actual absorbed dose measured by the Radiation Assessment Detector (RAD) is 76 mGy/yr at the surface. Based on these measurements, for a round-trip Mars surface mission with 180 days (each way) cruise, and 500 days on the Martian surface for this current solar cycle, an astronaut would be exposed to a total mission dose equivalent of ~1.01 sievert. Exposure to 1 sievert is associated with a 5 percent increase in risk for developing fatal cancer. NASA's current lifetime limit for increased risk for its astronauts operating in low-Earth orbit is 3 percent. Maximum shielding from galactic cosmic rays can be obtained with about 3 meters of Martian soil.

The samples examined were probably once mud that for millions to tens of millions of years could have hosted living organisms. This wet environment had neutral pH, low salinity, and variable redox states of both iron and sulfur species. These types of iron and sulfur could have been used by living organisms. C, H, O, S, N, and P were measured directly as key biogenic elements, and by inference, P is assumed to have been there as well. The two samples, John Klein and Cumberland, contain basaltic minerals, Ca-sulfates, Fe oxide/hydroxides, Fe-sulfides, amorphous material, and trioctahedral smectites (a type of clay). Basaltic minerals in the mudstone are similar to those in nearby aeolian deposits. However, the mudstone has far less Fe-forsterite plus magnetite, so Fe-forsterite (type of olivine) was probably altered to form smectite (a type of clay) and magnetite. A Late Noachian/EarlyHesperian or younger age indicates that clay mineral formation on Mars extended beyond Noachian time; therefore, in this location neutral pH lasted longer than previously thought.

=== Dust and soils ===
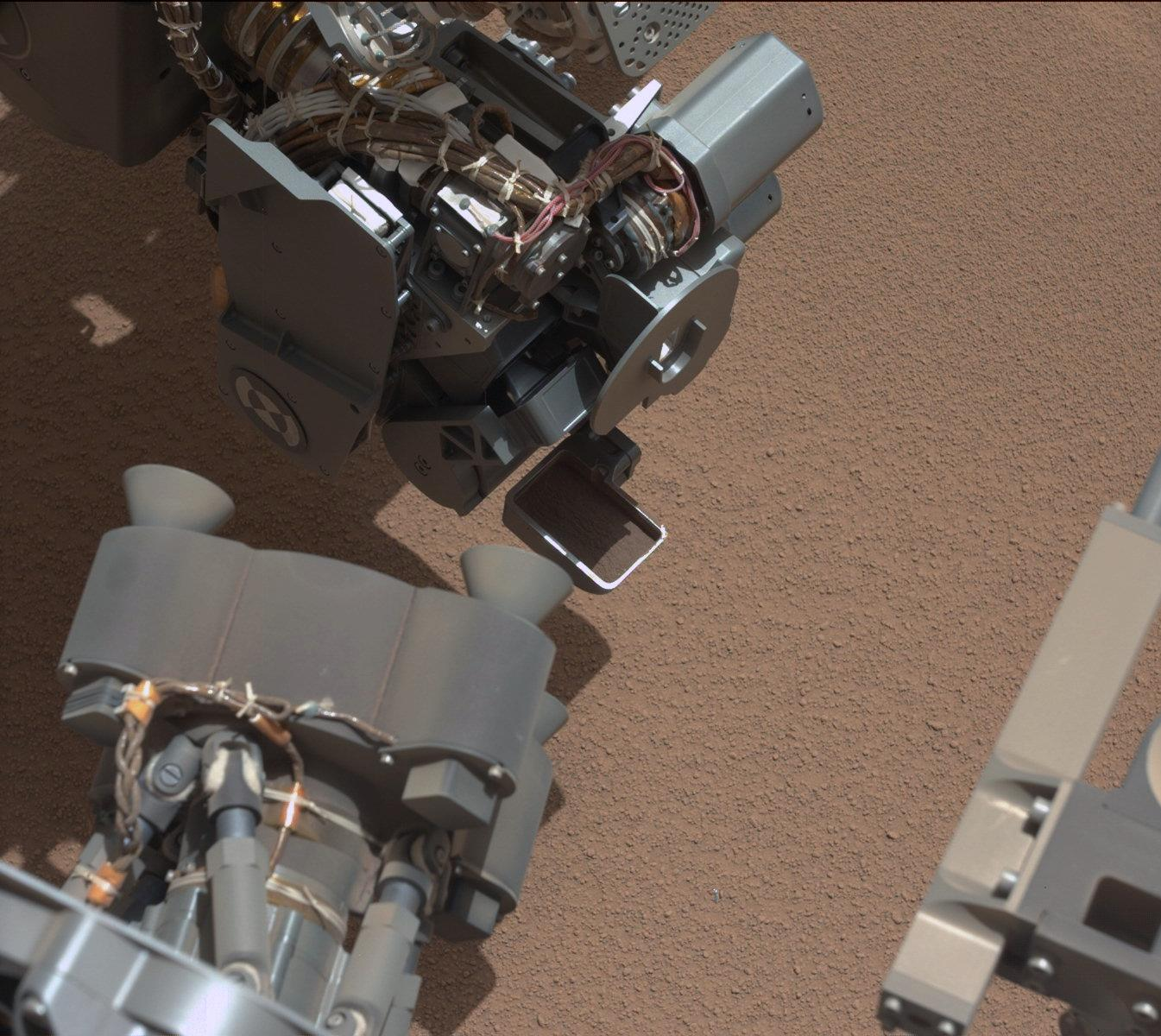
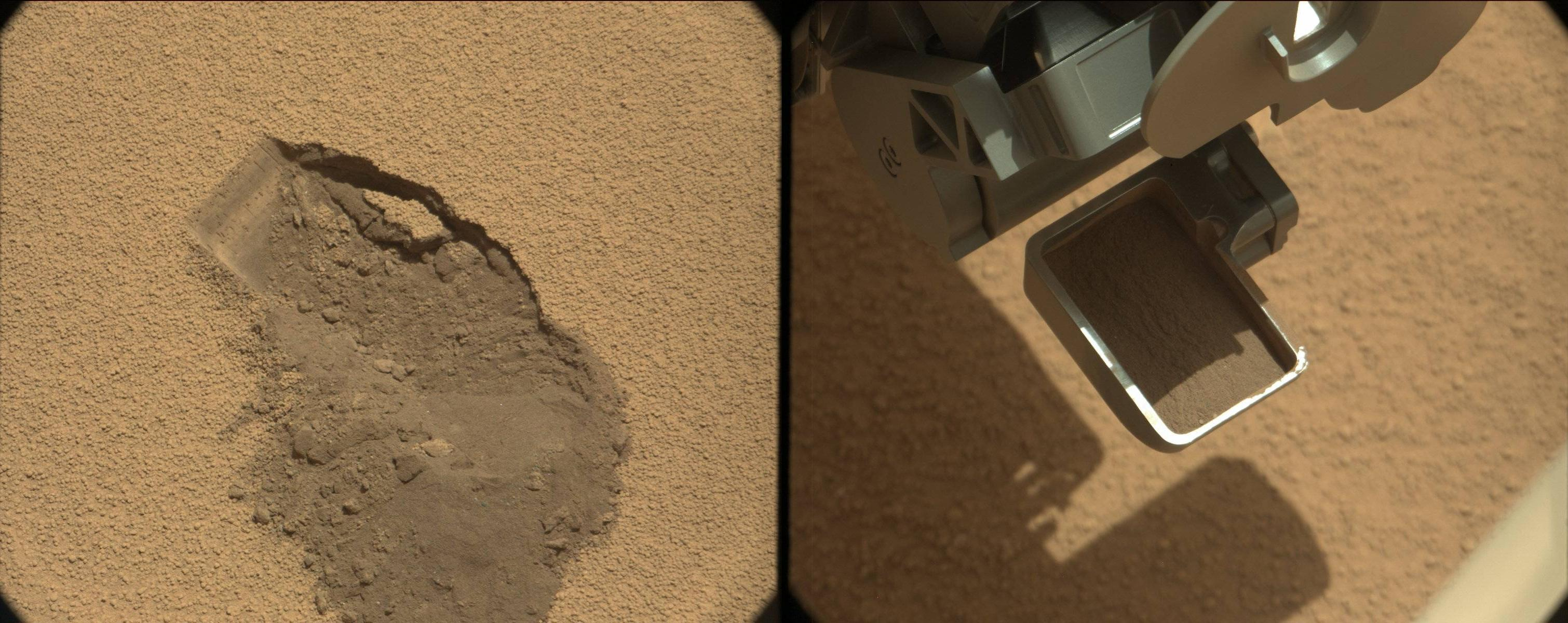
First use of the Curiosity rover scooper as it sifts a load of sand at "Rocknest" (October 7, 2012).

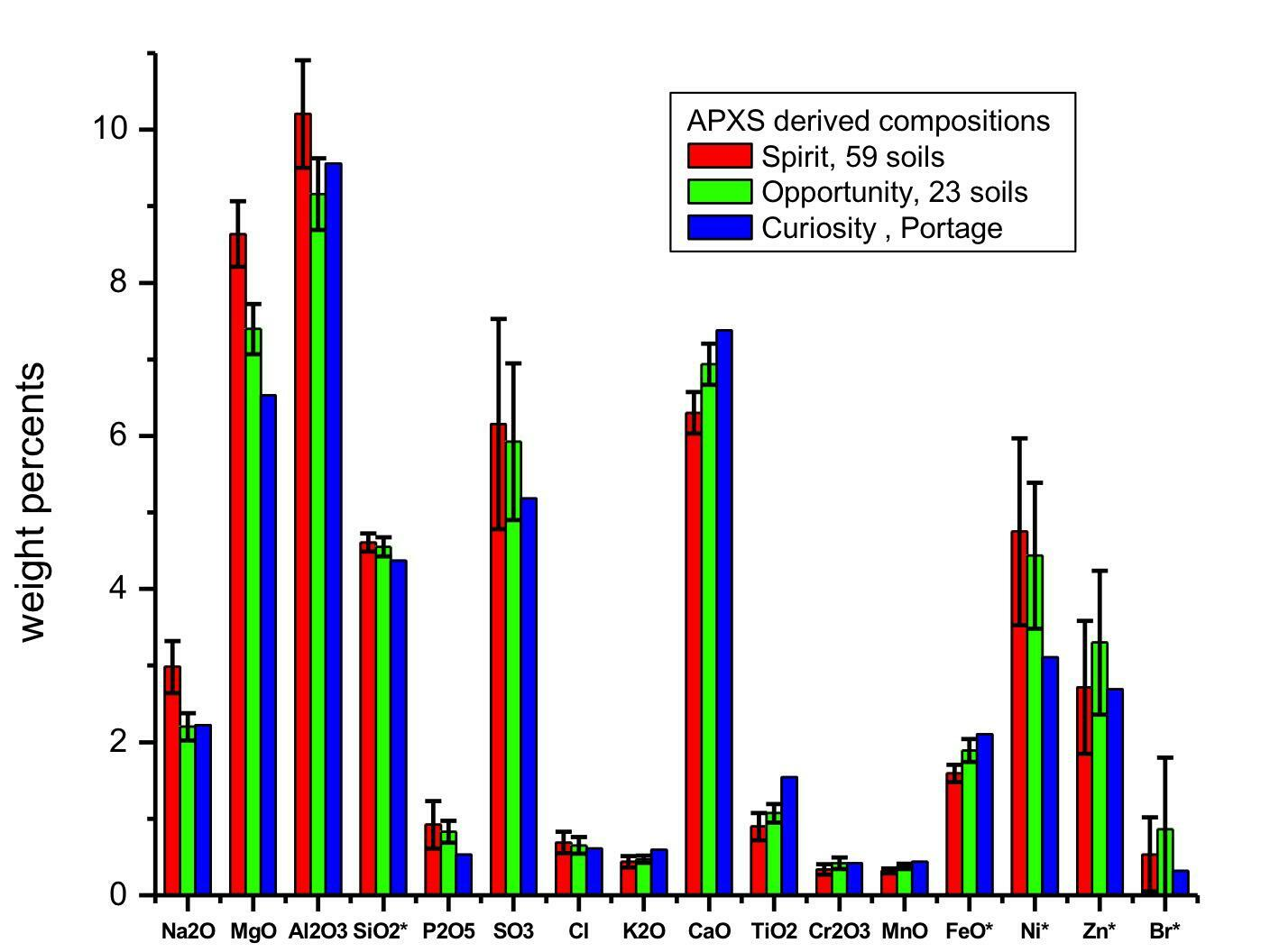
Comparison of Soils on Mars – Samples by Curiosity rover, Opportunity rover, Spirit rover (December 3, 2012).

Much of the Martian surface is deeply covered by dust as fine as talcum powder. The global predominance of dust obscures the underlying bedrock, making spectroscopic identification of primary minerals impossible from orbit over many areas of the planet. The red/orange appearance of the dust is caused by iron(III) oxide (nanophase Fe_{2}O_{3}) and the iron(III) oxide-hydroxide mineral goethite.

The Mars Exploration Rovers identified magnetite as the mineral responsible for making the dust magnetic. It probably also contains some titanium.

The global dust cover and the presence of other wind-blown sediments has made soil compositions remarkably uniform across the Martian surface. Analysis of soil samples from the Viking landers in 1976 shows that the soils consist of finely broken up basaltic rock fragments and are highly enriched in sulphur and chlorine, probably derived from volcanic gas emissions.

=== Secondary (alteration) minerals ===
Minerals produced through hydrothermal alteration and weathering of primary basaltic minerals are also present on Mars. Secondary minerals include hematite, phyllosilicates (clay minerals), goethite, jarosite, iron sulfate minerals, opaline silica, and gypsum. Many of these secondary minerals require liquid water to form (aqueous minerals).

Opaline silica and iron sulphate minerals form in acidic (low pH) solutions. Sulphates have been found in a variety of locations, including near Juventae Chasma, Ius Chasma, Melas Chasma, Candor Chasma, and Ganges Chasma. These sites all contain fluvial landforms indicating that abundant water was once present. Spirit rover discovered sulfates and goethite in the Columbia Hills.

Some of the mineral classes detected may have formed in environments suitable (i.e., enough water and the proper pH) for life. The mineral smectite (a phyllosilicate) forms in near-neutral waters. Phyllosilicates and carbonates are good for preserving organic matter, so they may contain evidence of past life. Sulfate deposits preserve chemical and morphological fossils, and fossils of microorganisms form in iron oxides like hematite. The presence of opaline silica points toward a hydrothermal environment that could support life. Silica is also excellent for preserving evidence of microbes.

=== Sedimentary rocks ===
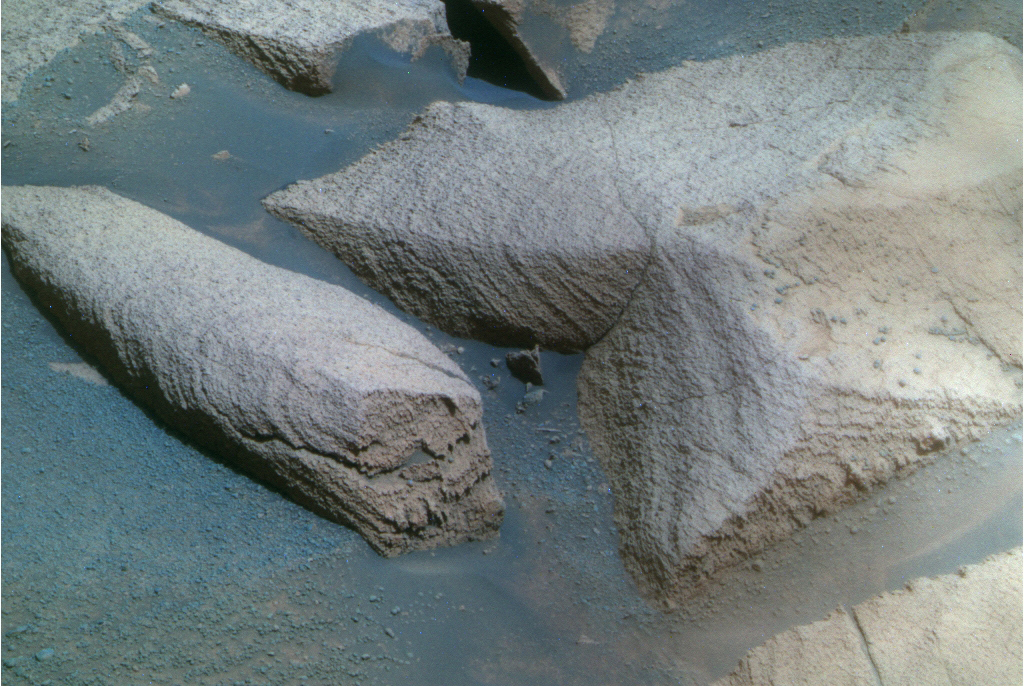
Cross-bedded sandstones inside Victoria Crater.

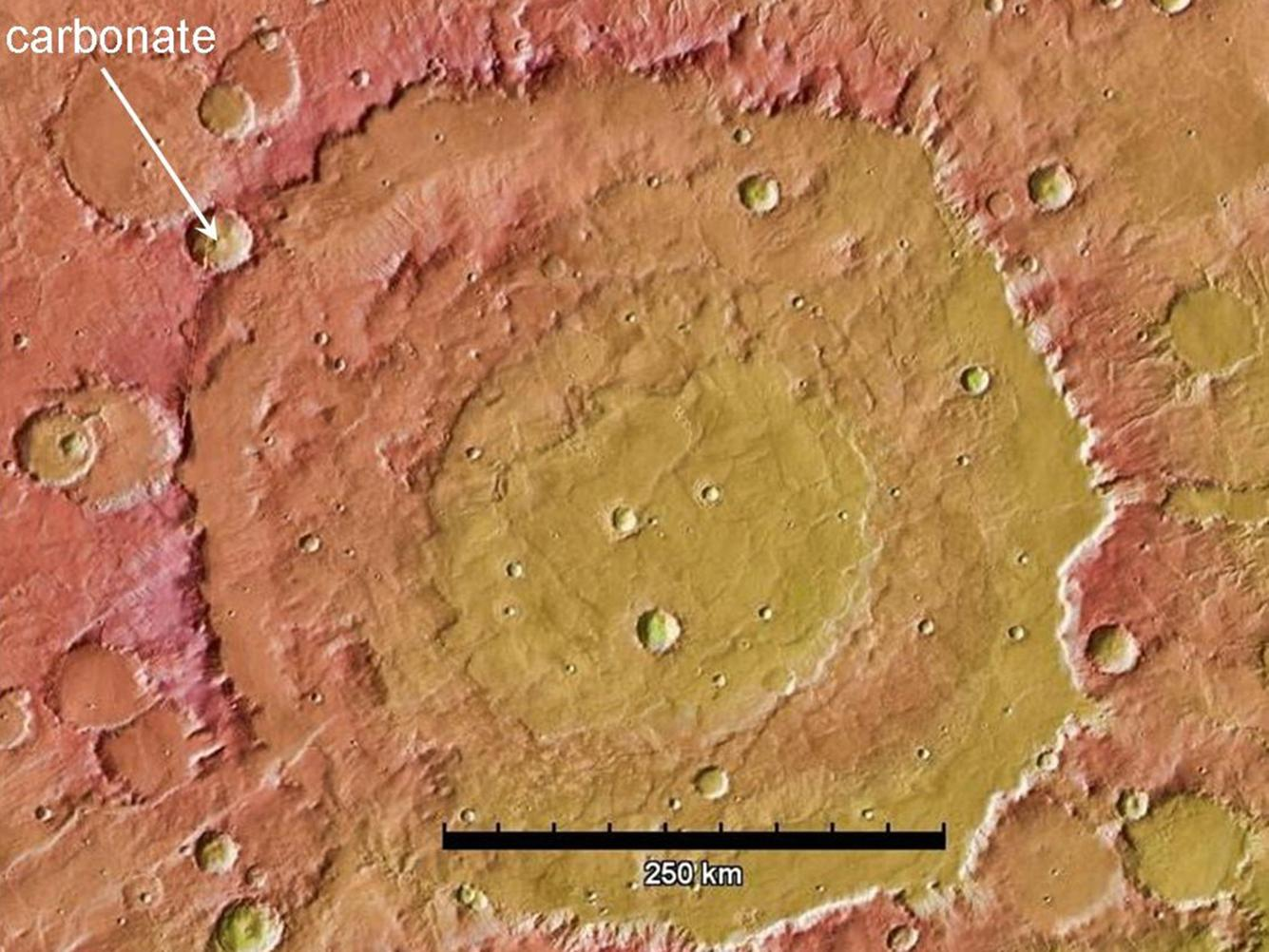
Huygens Crater with circle showing place where carbonate was discovered. This deposit may represent a time when Mars had abundant liquid water on its surface. Scale bar is 250 kilometres (160 mi) long.

Layered sedimentary deposits are widespread on Mars. These deposits probably consist of both sedimentary rock and poorly indurated or unconsolidated sediments. Thick sedimentary deposits occur in the interior of several canyons in Valles Marineris, within large craters in Arabia and Meridiani Planum (see Henry Crater for example), and probably comprise much of the deposits in the northern lowlands (e.g., Vastitas Borealis Formation). The Mars Exploration Rover Opportunity landed in an area containing cross-bedded (mainly eolian) sandstones (Burns formation). Fluvial-deltaic deposits are present in Eberswalde Crater and elsewhere, and photogeologic evidence suggests that many craters and low lying intercrater areas in the southern highlands contain Noachian-aged lake sediments.

While the possibility of carbonates on Mars has been of great interest to astrobiologists and geochemists alike, there was little evidence for significant quantities of carbonate deposits on the surface. In the summer of 2008, the TEGA and WCL experiments on the 2007 Phoenix Mars lander found between 3–5wt% (percent by weight) calcite (CaCO_{3}) and an alkaline soil. In 2010, analyses by the Mars Exploration Rover Spirit identified outcrops rich in magnesium-iron carbonate (16–34 wt%) in the Columbia Hills of Gusev crater. The magnesium-iron carbonate most likely precipitated from carbonate-bearing solutions under hydrothermal conditions at near-neutral pH in association with volcanic activity during the Noachian Period.

Carbonates (calcium or iron carbonates) were discovered in a crater on the rim of Huygens Crater, located in the Iapygia quadrangle. The impact on the rim exposed material that had been dug up from the impact that created Huygens. These minerals represent evidence that Mars once had a thicker carbon dioxide atmosphere with abundant moisture, since these kind of carbonates only form when there is a lot of water. They were found with the Compact Reconnaissance Imaging Spectrometer for Mars (CRISM) instrument on the Mars Reconnaissance Orbiter. Earlier, the instrument had detected clay minerals. The carbonates were found near the clay minerals. Both of these minerals form in wet environments. It is supposed that billions of years ago Mars was much warmer and wetter. At that time, carbonates would have formed from water and the carbon dioxide-rich atmosphere. Later the deposits of carbonate would have been buried. The double impact has now exposed the minerals. Earth has vast carbonate deposits in the form of limestone.

== Spirit rover discoveries in the Aeolis quadrangle ==
The rocks on the plains of Gusev are a type of basalt. They contain the minerals olivine, pyroxene, plagioclase, and magnetite, and they look like volcanic basalt as they are fine-grained with irregular holes (geologists would say they have vesicles and vugs). Much of the soil on the plains came from the breakdown of the local rocks. Fairly high levels of nickel were found in some soils; probably from meteorites. Analysis shows that the rocks have been slightly altered by tiny amounts of water. Outside coatings and cracks inside the rocks suggest water deposited minerals, maybe bromine compounds. All the rocks contain a fine coating of dust and one or more harder rinds of material. One type can be brushed off, while another needed to be ground off by the Rock Abrasion Tool (RAT).

There are a variety of rocks in the Columbia Hills (Mars), some of which have been altered by water, but not by very much water.

The dust in Gusev Crater is the same as dust all around the planet. All the dust was found to be magnetic. Moreover, Spirit found the magnetism was caused by the mineral magnetite, especially magnetite that contained the element titanium. One magnet was able to completely divert all dust hence all Martian dust is thought to be magnetic. The spectra of the dust was similar to spectra of bright, low thermal inertia regions like Tharsis and Arabia that have been detected by orbiting satellites. A thin layer of dust, maybe less than one millimeter thick covers all surfaces. Something in it contains a small amount of chemically bound water.

=== Plains ===
Adirondack
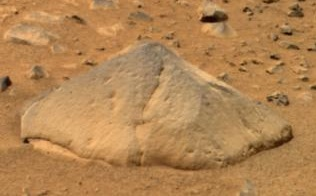
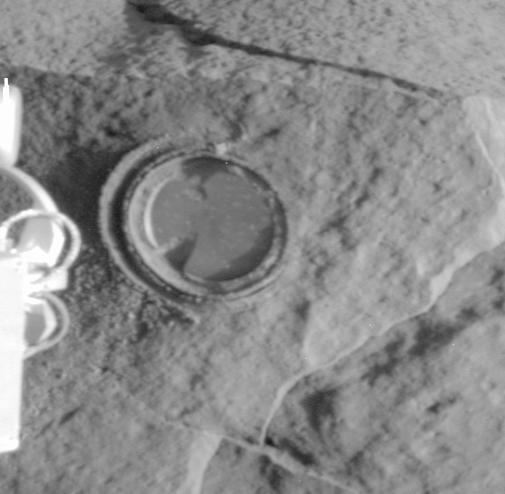
- Above: An approximate true-color view of Adirondack, taken by Spirit's pancam. Right: Digital camera image (from Spirit's Pancam) of Adirondack after a RAT grind (Spirit's rock grinding tool)
- Feature type: Rock
- Coordinates: 14.6°S 175.5°E

Observations of rocks on the plains show they contain the minerals pyroxene, olivine, plagioclase, and magnetite. These rocks can be classified in different ways. The amounts and types of minerals make the rocks primitive basalts—also called picritic basalts. The rocks are similar to ancient terrestrial rocks called basaltic komatiites. Rocks of the plains also resemble the basaltic shergottites, meteorites which came from Mars. One classification system compares the amount of alkali elements to the amount of silica on a graph; in this system, Gusev plains rocks lie near the junction of basalt, picrobasalt, and tephrite. The Irvine-Barager classification calls them basalts. Plain's rocks have been very slightly altered, probably by thin films of water because they are softer and contain veins of light colored material that may be bromine compounds, as well as coatings or rinds. It is thought that small amounts of water may have gotten into cracks inducing mineralization processes). Coatings on the rocks may have occurred when rocks were buried and interacted with thin films of water and dust. One sign that they were altered was that it was easier to grind these rocks compared to the same types of rocks found on Earth.

The first rock that Spirit studied was Adirondack. It turned out to be typical of the other rocks on the plains.

=== Columbia Hills ===
Scientists found a variety of rock types in the Columbia Hills, and they placed them into six different categories. The six are: Adirondack, Clovis, Wishstone, Peace, Watchtower, Backstay, and Independence. They are named after a prominent rock in each group. Their chemical compositions, as measured by APXS, are significantly different from each other. Most importantly, all of the rocks in Columbia Hills show various degrees of alteration due to aqueous fluids. They are enriched in the elements phosphorus, sulfur, chlorine, and bromine—all of which can be carried around in water solutions. The Columbia Hills' rocks contain basaltic glass, along with varying amounts of olivine and sulfates. The olivine abundance varies inversely with the amount of sulfates. This is exactly what is expected because water destroys olivine but helps to produce sulfates.

The Clovis group is especially interesting because the Mossbauer spectrometer (MB) detected goethite in it. Goethite forms only in the presence of water, so its discovery is the first direct evidence of past water in the Columbia Hills's rocks. In addition, the MB spectra of rocks and outcrops displayed a strong decline in olivine presence, although the rocks probably once contained much olivine. Olivine is a marker for the lack of water because it easily decomposes in the presence of water. Sulfate was found, and it needs water to form.

Wishstone contained a great deal of plagioclase, some olivine, and anhydrate (a sulfate). Peace rocks showed sulfur and strong evidence for bound water, so hydrated sulfates are suspected. Watchtower class rocks lack olivine consequently they may have been altered by water. The Independence class showed some signs of clay (perhaps montmorillonite a member of the smectite group). Clays require fairly long term exposure to water to form.

One type of soil, called Paso Robles, from the Columbia Hills, may be an evaporate deposit because it contains large amounts of sulfur, phosphorus, calcium, and iron. Also, MB found that much of the iron in Paso Robles soil was of the oxidized, Fe^{+++} form, which would happen if water had been present.

Towards the middle of the six-year mission (a mission that was supposed to last only 90 days), large amounts of pure silica were found in the soil. The silica could have come from the interaction of soil with acid vapors produced by volcanic activity in the presence of water or from water in a hot spring environment.

After Spirit stopped working scientists studied old data from the Miniature Thermal Emission Spectrometer, or Mini-TES and confirmed the presence of large amounts of carbonate-rich rocks, which means that regions of the planet may have once harbored water. The carbonates were discovered in an outcrop of rocks called "Comanche."

In summary, Spirit found evidence of slight weathering on the plains of Gusev, but no evidence that a lake was there. However, in the Columbia Hills there was clear evidence for a moderate amount of aqueous weathering. The evidence included sulfates and the minerals goethite and carbonates which only form in the presence of water. It is believed that Gusev crater may have held a lake long ago, but it has since been covered by igneous materials. All the dust contains a magnetic component which was identified as magnetite with some titanium. Furthermore, the thin coating of dust that covers everything on Mars is the same in all parts of the planet.

== Opportunity rover discoveries in the Margaritifer Sinus quadrangle ==
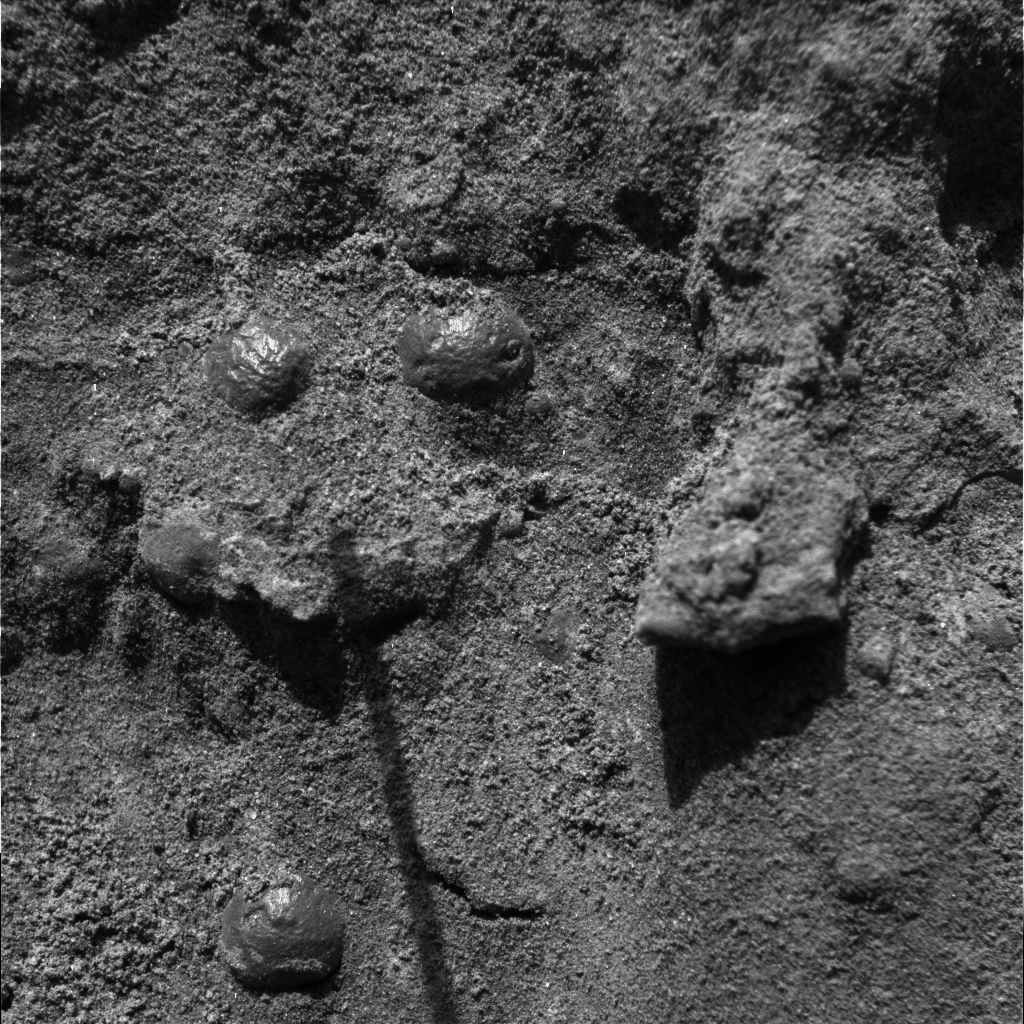
This image, taken by the microscopic imager, reveals shiny, spherical objects embedded within the trench wall

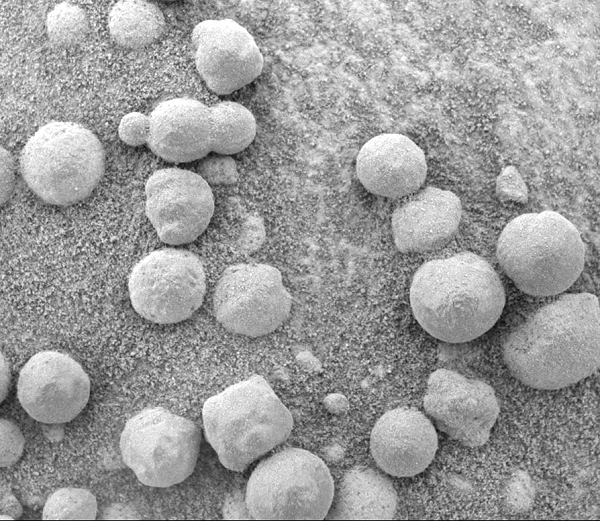
"Blueberries" (hematite spheres) on a rocky outcrop at Eagle Crater. Note the merged triplet in the upper left.

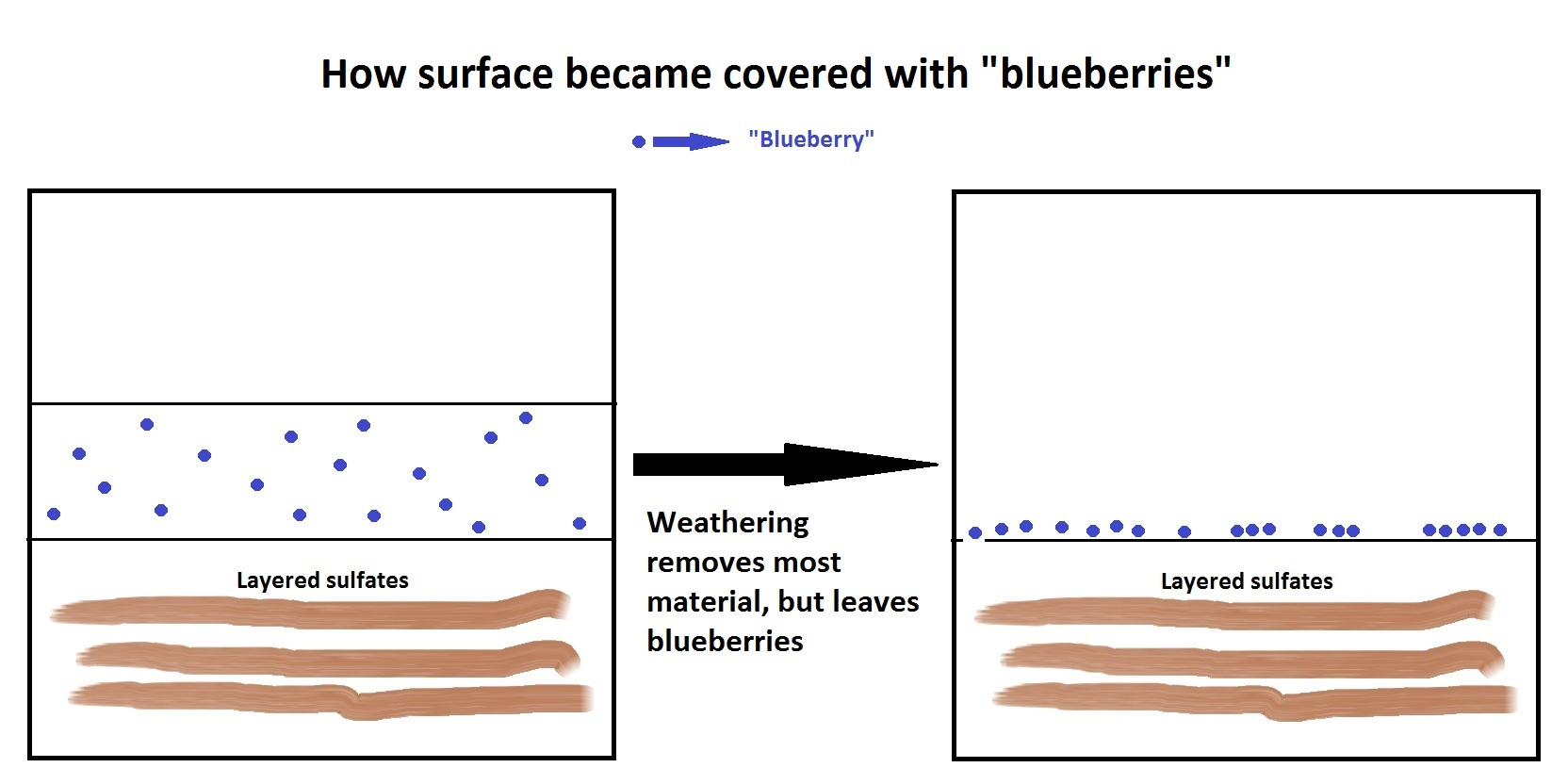
Drawing showing how "blueberries" came to cover much of surface in Meridiani Planum.

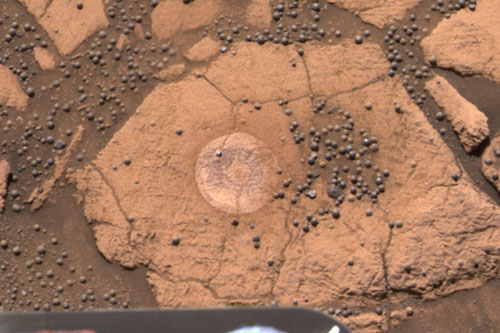
The rock "Berry Bowl".

Opportunity rover found that the soil at Meridiani Planum was very similar to the soil at Gusev crater and Ares Vallis; however in many places at Meridiani the soil was covered with round, hard, gray spherules that were named "blueberries." These blueberries were found to be composed almost entirely of the mineral hematite. It was decided that the spectra signal spotted from orbit by Mars Odyssey was produced by these spherules. After further study it was decided that the blueberries were concretions formed in the ground by water. Over time, these concretions weathered from what was overlying rock, and then became concentrated on the surface as a lag deposit. The concentration of spherules in bedrock could have produced the observed blueberry covering from the weathering of as little as one meter of rock. Most of the soil consisted of olivine basalt sands that did not come from the local rocks. The sand may have been transported from somewhere else.

=== Minerals in dust ===
A Mössbauer spectrograph was made of the dust that gathered on Opportunity's capture magnet. The results suggested that the magnetic component of the dust was titanomagnetite, rather than just plain magnetite, as was once thought. A small amount of olivine was also detected which was interpreted as indicating a long arid period on the planet. On the other hand, a small amount of hematite that was present meant that there may have been liquid water for a short time in the early history of the planet.

Because the Rock Abrasion Tool (RAT) found it easy to grind into the bedrocks, it is thought that the rocks are much softer than the rocks at Gusev crater.

=== Bedrock minerals ===
Few rocks were visible on the surface where Opportunity landed, but bedrock that was exposed in craters was examined by the suite of instruments on the Rover. Bedrock rocks were found to be sedimentary rocks with a high concentration of sulfur in the form of calcium and magnesium sulfates. Some of the sulfates that may be present in bedrocks are kieserite, sulfate anhydrate, bassanite, hexahydrite, epsomite, and gypsum. Salts, such as halite, bischofite, antarcticite, bloedite, vanthoffite, or glauberite may also be present.

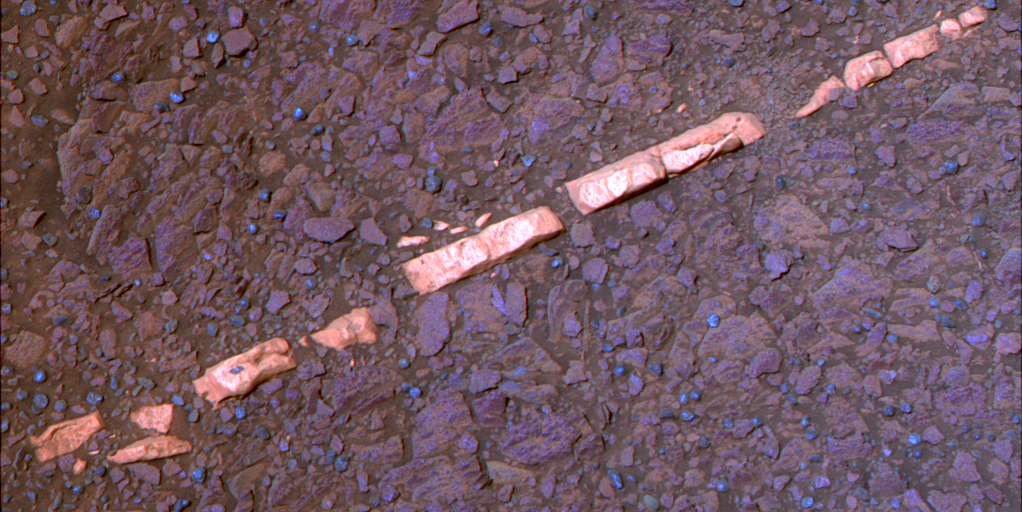
"Homestake" formation

The rocks contained the sulfates had a light tone compared to isolated rocks and rocks examined by landers/rovers at other locations on Mars. The spectra of these light toned rocks, containing hydrated sulfates, were similar to spectra taken by the Thermal Emission Spectrometer on board the Mars Global Surveyor. The same spectrum is found over a large area, so it is believed that water once appeared over a wide region, not just in the area explored by Opportunity.

The Alpha Particle X-ray Spectrometer (APXS) found rather high levels of phosphorus in the rocks. Similar high levels were found by other rovers at Ares Vallis and Gusev Crater, so it has been hypothesized that the mantle of Mars may be phosphorus-rich. The minerals in the rocks could have originated by acid weathering of basalt. Because the solubility of phosphorus is related to the solubility of uranium, thorium, and rare earth elements, they are all also expected to be enriched in rocks.

When Opportunity rover traveled to the rim of Endeavour crater, it soon found a white vein that was later identified as being pure gypsum. It was formed when water carrying gypsum in solution deposited the mineral in a crack in the rock. A picture of this vein, called "Homestake" formation, is shown below.

=== Evidence of water ===
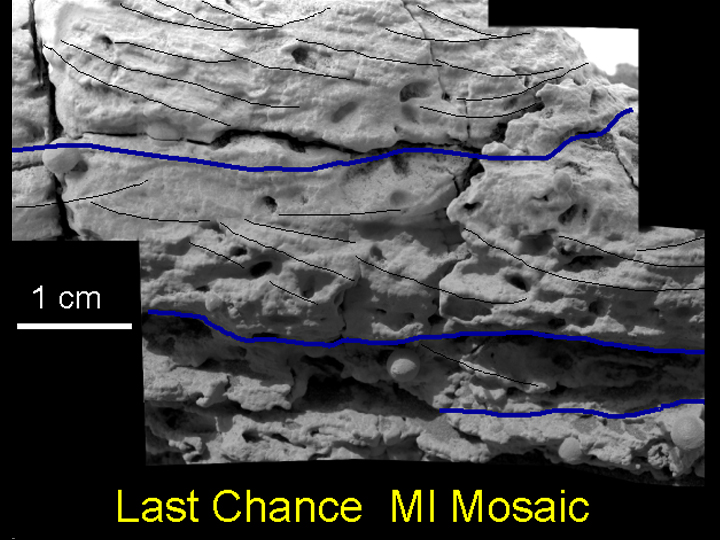
Cross-bedding features in rock "Last Chance".

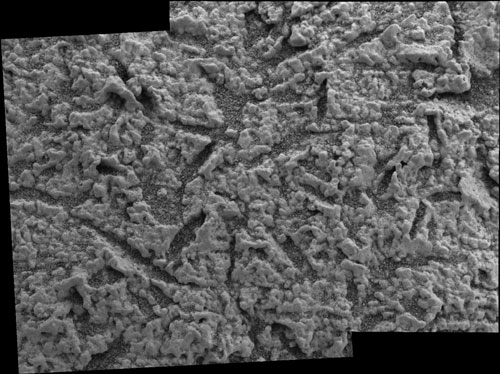
Voids or "vugs" inside the rock

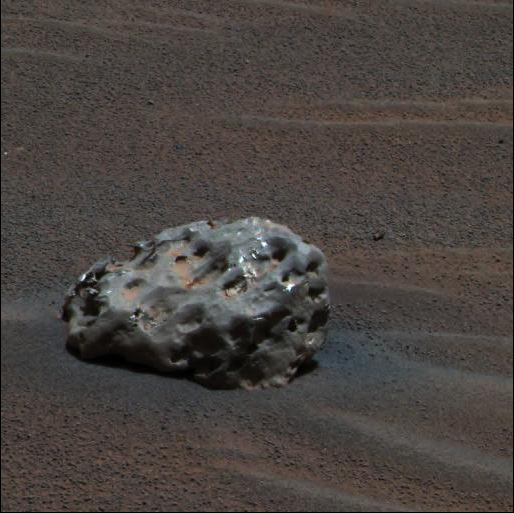
Heat Shield Rock was the first meteorite ever identified on another planet.

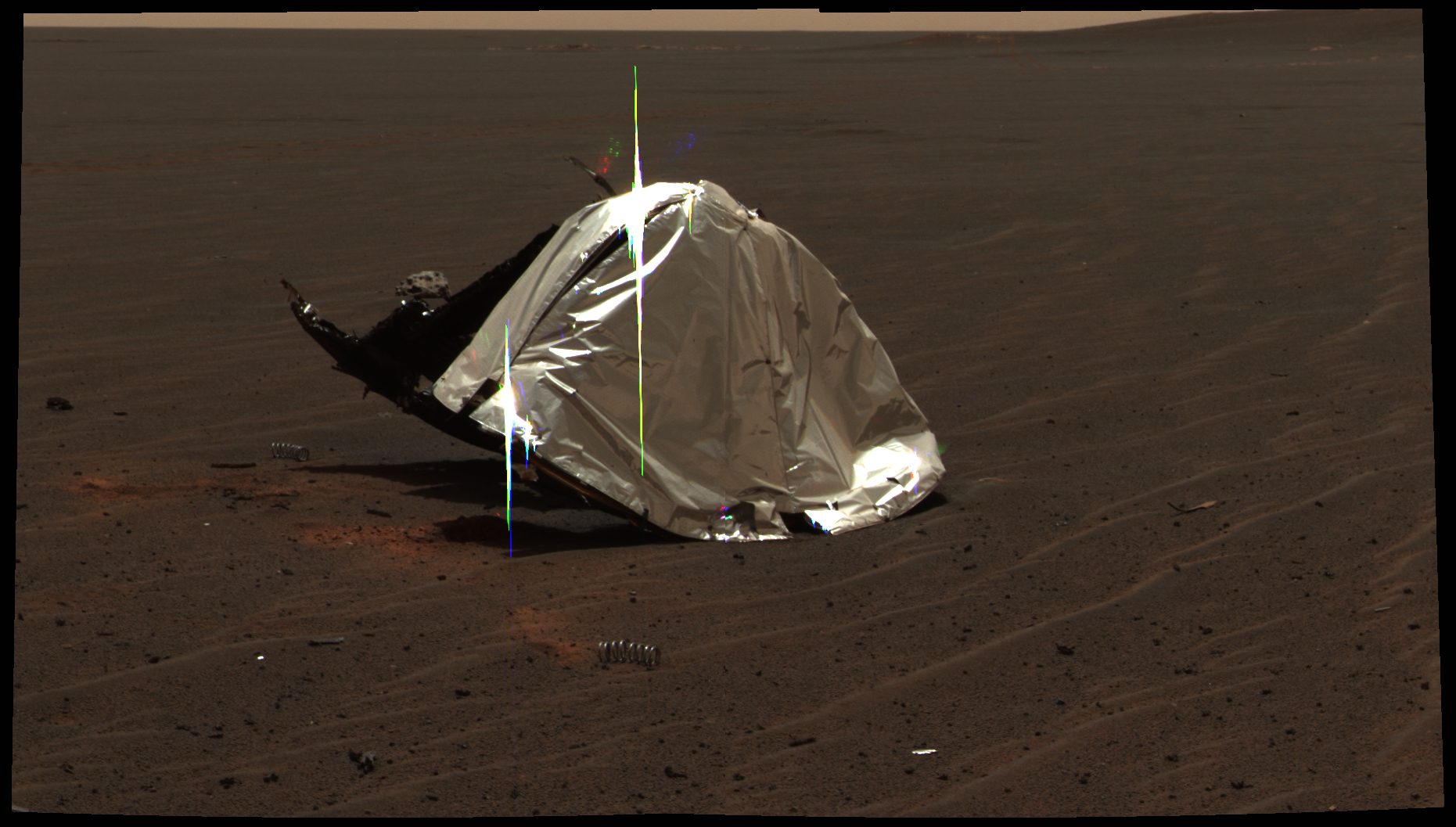
Heat shield, with Heat Shield Rock just above and to the left in the background.

Examination in 2004 of Meridiani rocks, showed the first strong in situ evidence for past water by detecting the mineral jarosite, which only forms in water. This discovery proved that water once existed in Meridiani Planum. In addition, some rocks showed small laminations (layers) with shapes that are only made by gently flowing water. The first such laminations were found in a rock called "The Dells." Geologists would say that the cross-stratification showed festoon geometry from transport in subaqueous ripples. A picture of cross-stratification, also called cross-bedding, is shown on the left.

Box-shaped holes in some rocks were caused by sulfates forming large crystals, and then when the crystals later dissolved, holes, called vugs, were left behind. The concentration of the element bromine in rocks was highly variable probably because it is very soluble. Water may have concentrated it in places before it evaporated. Another mechanism for concentrating highly soluble bromine compounds is frost deposition at night that would form very thin films of water that would concentrate bromine in certain spots.

=== Rock from impact ===
One rock, "Bounce Rock," found sitting on the sandy plains was found to be ejecta from an impact crater. Its chemistry was different from the bedrocks. Containing mostly pyroxene and plagioclase and no olivine, it closely resembled a part, Lithology B, of the shergottite meteorite EETA 79001, a meteorite known to have come from Mars. Bounce rock received its name by being near an airbag bounce mark.

=== Meteorites ===
Opportunity rover found meteorites just sitting on the plains. The first one analyzed with Opportunity's instruments was called "Heatshield Rock," as it was found near where Opportunity's heatshield landed. Examination with the Miniature Thermal Emission Spectrometer (Mini-TES), Mossbauer spectrometer, and APXS lead researchers to classify it as an IAB meteorite. The APXS determined it was composed of 93% iron and 7% nickel. The cobble named "Fig Tree Barberton" is thought to be a stony or stony-iron meteorite (mesosiderite silicate), while "Allan Hills," and "Zhong Shan" may be iron meteorites.

=== Geological history ===
Observations at the site have led scientists to believe that the area was flooded with water a number of times and was subjected to evaporation and desiccation. In the process sulfates were deposited. After sulfates cemented the sediments, hematite concretions grew by precipitation from groundwater. Some sulfates formed into large crystals which later dissolved to leave vugs. Several lines of evidence point toward an arid climate in the past billion years or so, but a climate supporting water, at least for a time, in the distant past.

== Curiosity rover discoveries in the Aeolis quadrangle ==
The Curiosity rover encountered rocks of special interest on the surface of Aeolis Palus near Aeolis Mons ("Mount Sharp") in Gale Crater. In the autumn of 2012, rocks studied, on the way from Bradbury Landing to Glenelg Intrigue, included "Coronation" rock (August 19, 2012), "Jake Matijevic" rock (September 19, 2012), "Bathurst Inlet" rock (September 30, 2012).

=== Evidence for ancient water ===
On September 27, 2012, NASA scientists announced that the Curiosity rover found evidence for an ancient streambed suggesting a "vigorous flow" of water on Mars.

Evidence of water on Mars

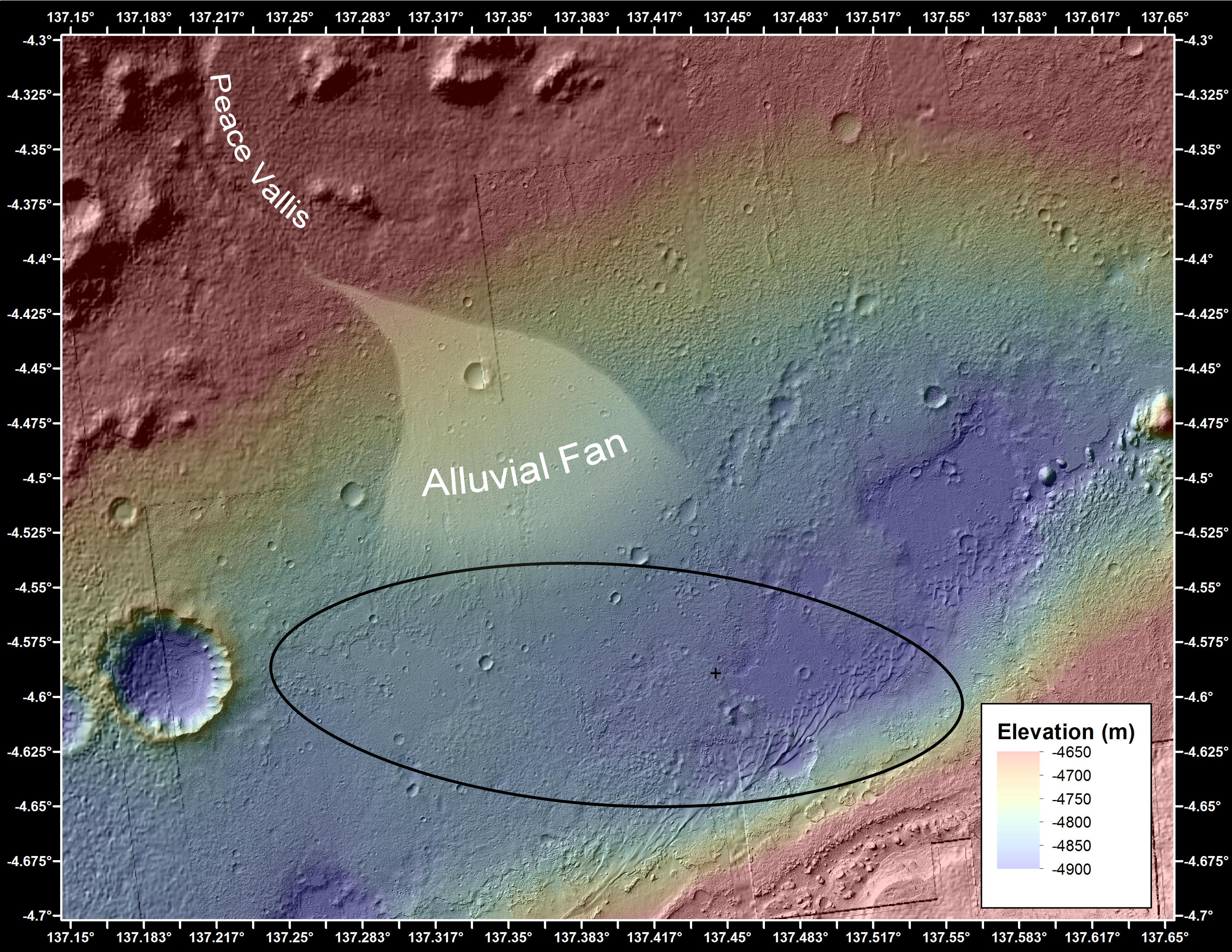
Peace Vallis and related alluvial fan near the Curiosity rover landing ellipse and landing site (noted by +).

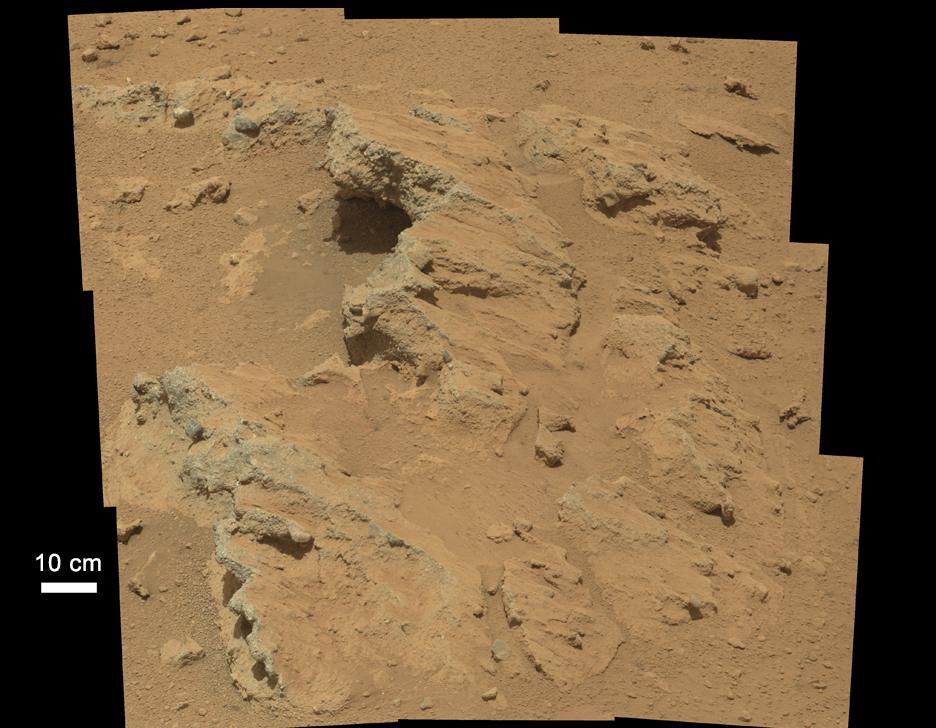
"Hottah" rock outcrop on Mars – an ancient streambed viewed by the Curiosity rover (September 14, 2012) (close-up) (3-D version).

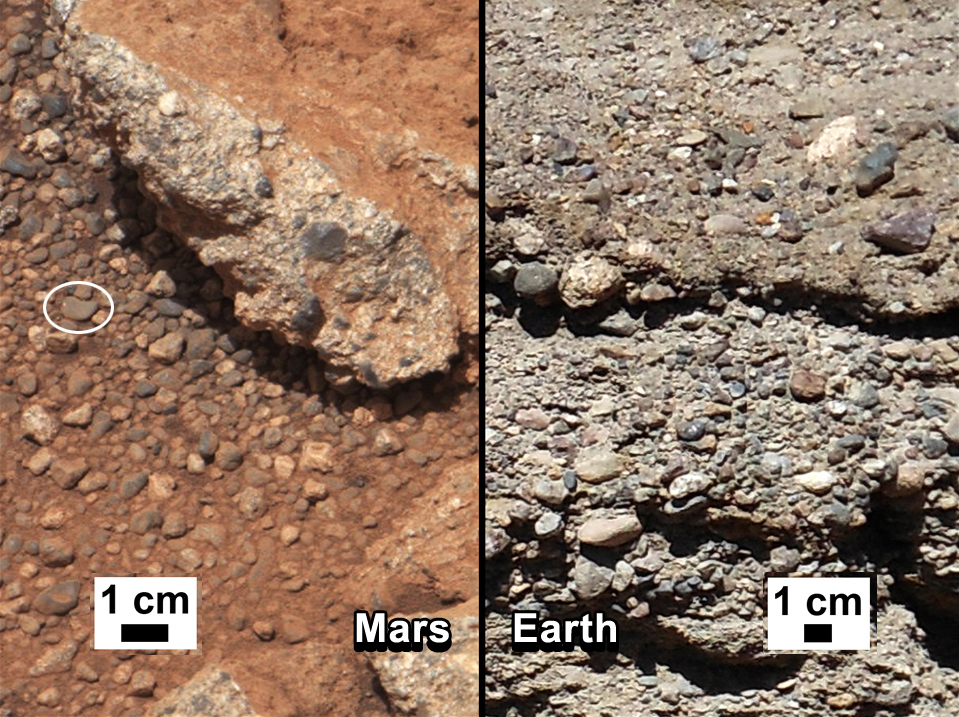
"Link" rock outcrop on Mars – compared with a terrestrial fluvial conglomerate – suggesting water "vigorously" flowing in a stream.

Curiosity rover on the way to Glenelg (September 26, 2012).

On December 3, 2012, NASA reported that Curiosity performed its first extensive soil analysis, revealing the presence of water molecules, sulfur and chlorine in the Martian soil. On December 9, 2013, NASA reported that, based on evidence from Curiosity rover studying Aeolis Palus, Gale Crater contained an ancient freshwater lake which could have been a hospitable environment for microbial life.

=== Evidence for ancient habitability ===
In March 2013, NASA reported Curiosity found evidence that geochemical conditions in Gale Crater were once suitable for microbial life after analyzing the first drilled sample of Martian rock, "John Klein" rock at Yellowknife Bay in Gale Crater. The rover detected water, carbon dioxide, oxygen, sulfur dioxide and hydrogen sulfide. Chloromethane and dichloromethane were also detected. Related tests found results consistent with the presence of smectite clay minerals.

Curiosity rover – Chemical Analysis
(Drilled Sample of "John Klein" rock, Yellowknife Bay, February 27, 2013)

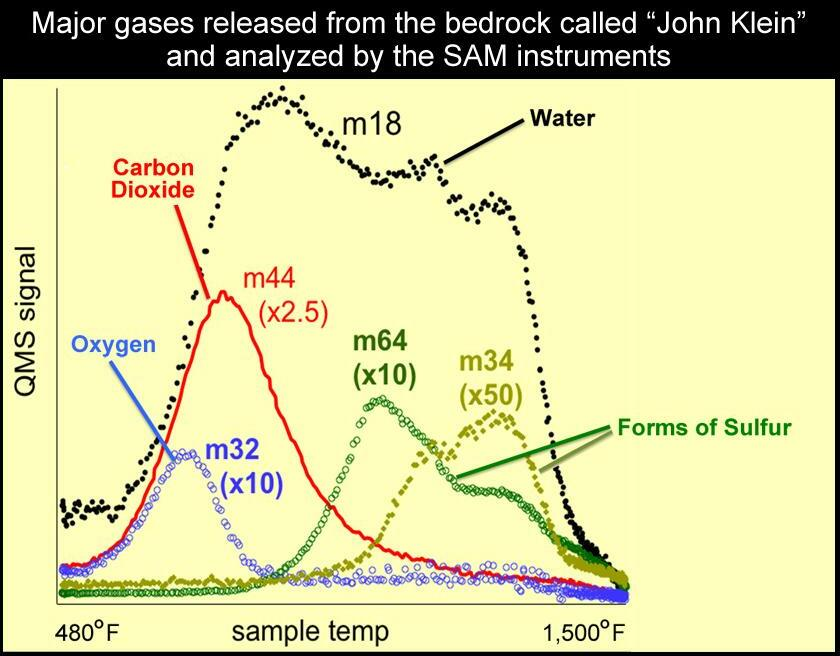
Sample Analysis at Mars (SAM)

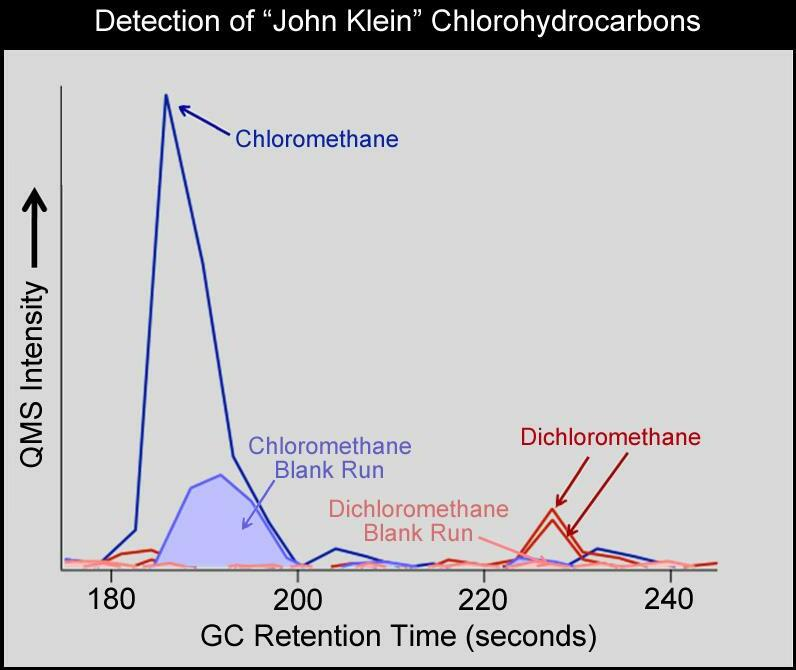
Gas chromatograph mass spectrometer (GCMS)

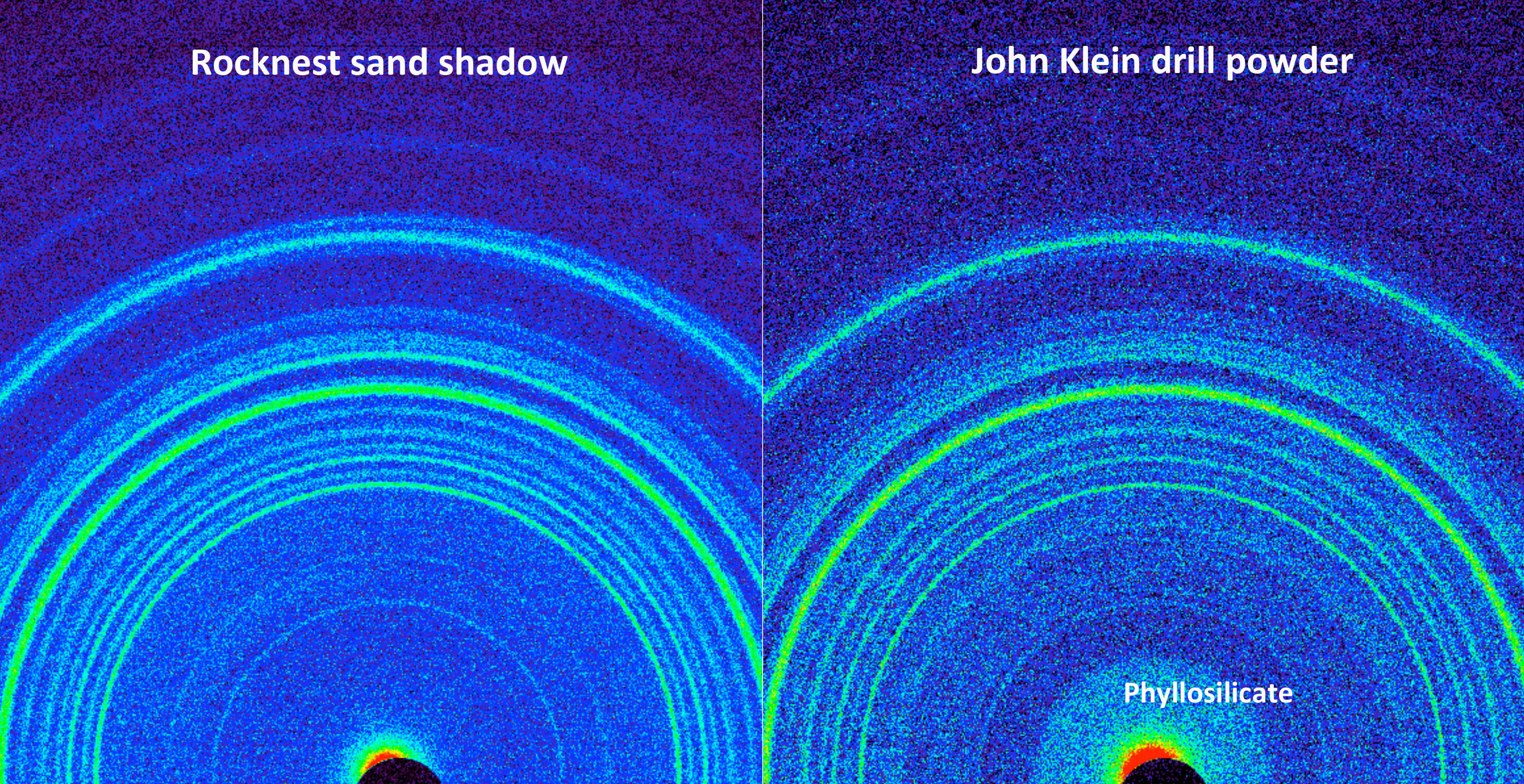
Chemistry and Mineralogy instrument (CheMin)

=== Detection of organics ===
On 16 December 2014, NASA reported the Curiosity rover detected a "tenfold spike", likely localized, in the amount of methane in the Martian atmosphere. Sample measurements taken "a dozen times over 20 months" showed increases in late 2013 and early 2014, averaging "7 parts of methane per billion in the atmosphere." Before and after that, readings averaged around one-tenth that level.

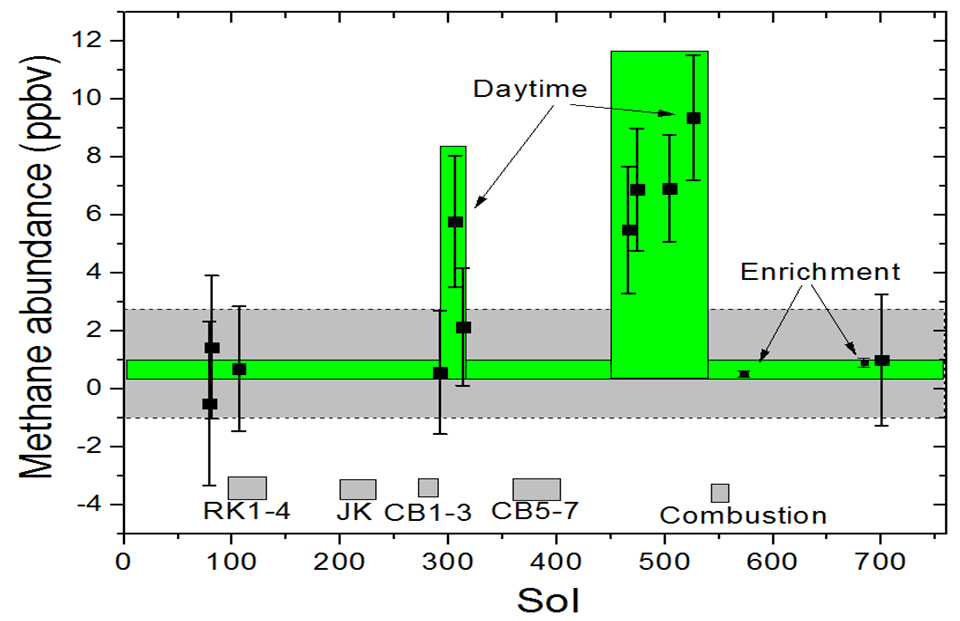
Methane measurements in the atmosphere of Mars
by the Curiosity rover (August 2012 to September 2014).

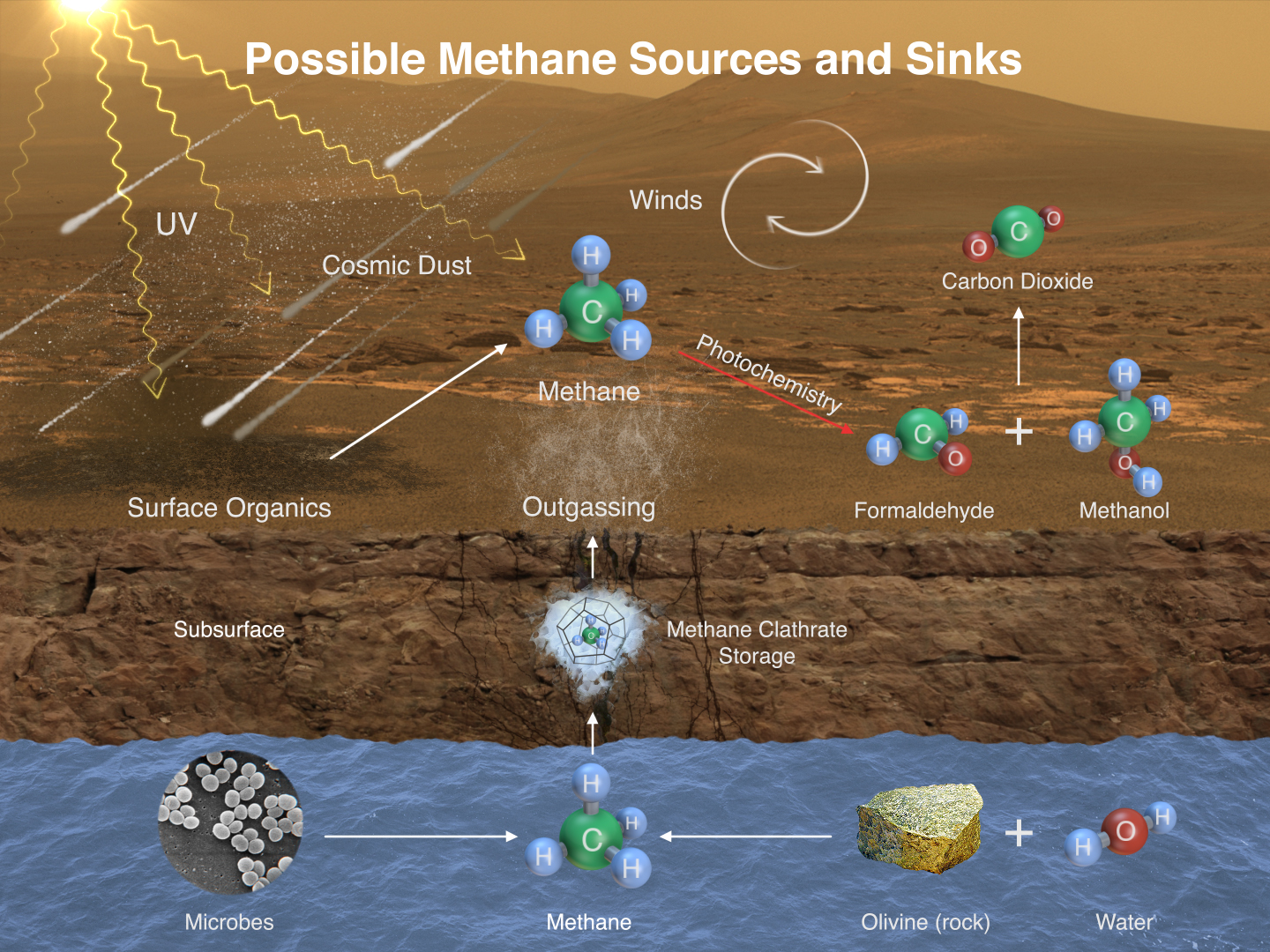
Methane (CH_{4}) on Mars – potential sources and sinks.

In addition, high levels of organic chemicals, particularly chlorobenzene, were detected in powder drilled from one of the rocks, named "Cumberland", analyzed by the Curiosity rover.

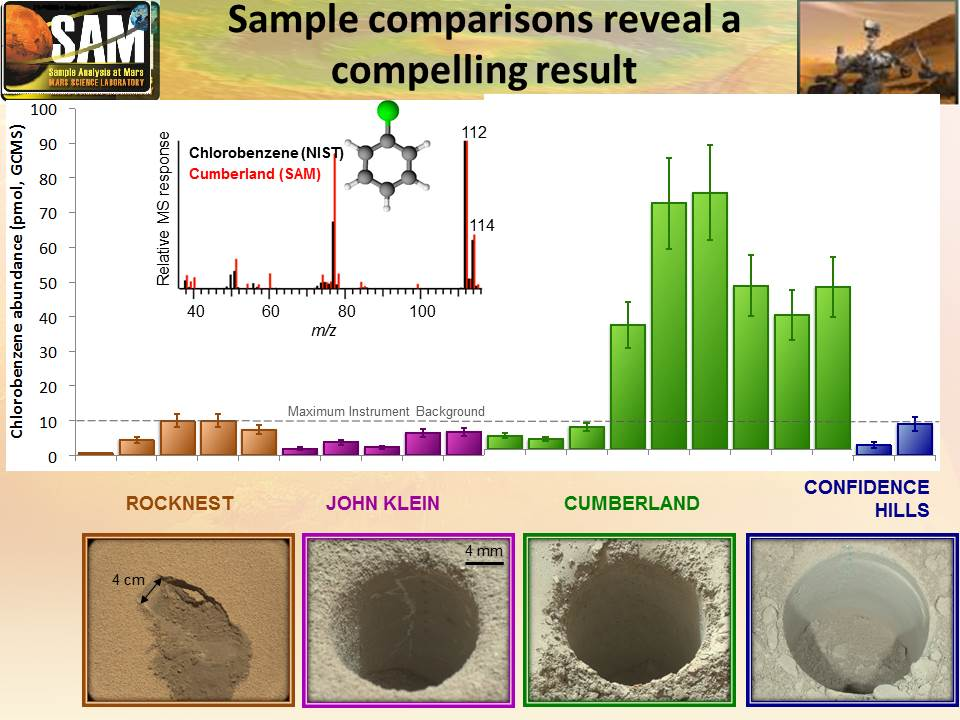
Comparison of Organics in Martian rocks – Chlorobenzene levels were much higher in the "Cumberland" rock sample.

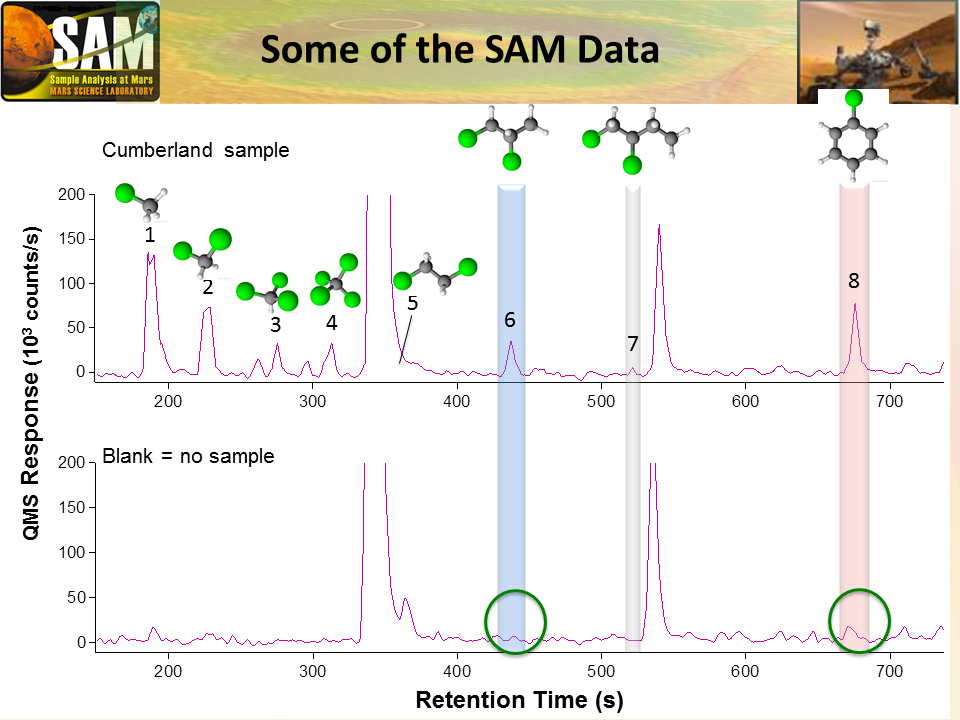
Detection of Organics in the "Cumberland" rock sample.

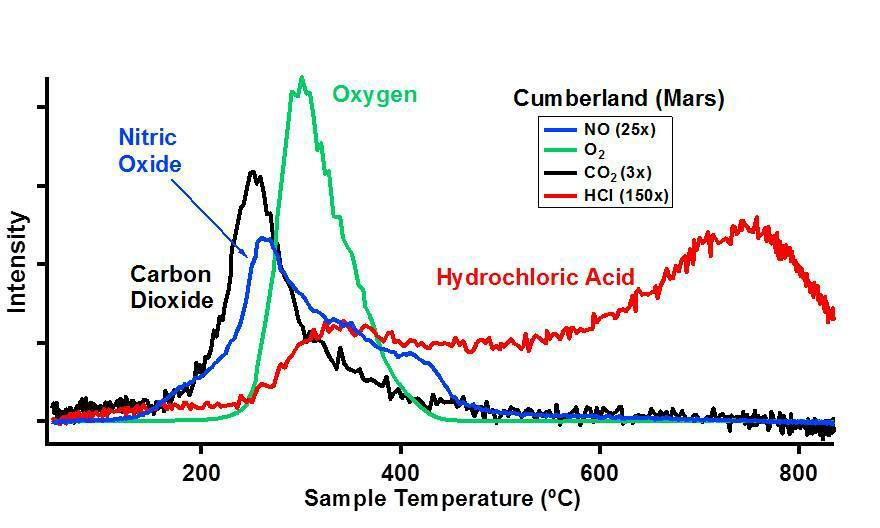
Spectral Analysis (SAM) of "Cumberland" rock.

=== Sulfur ===
In 2024, Curiosity discovered a rock containing abundant elemental sulfur.

== Images ==
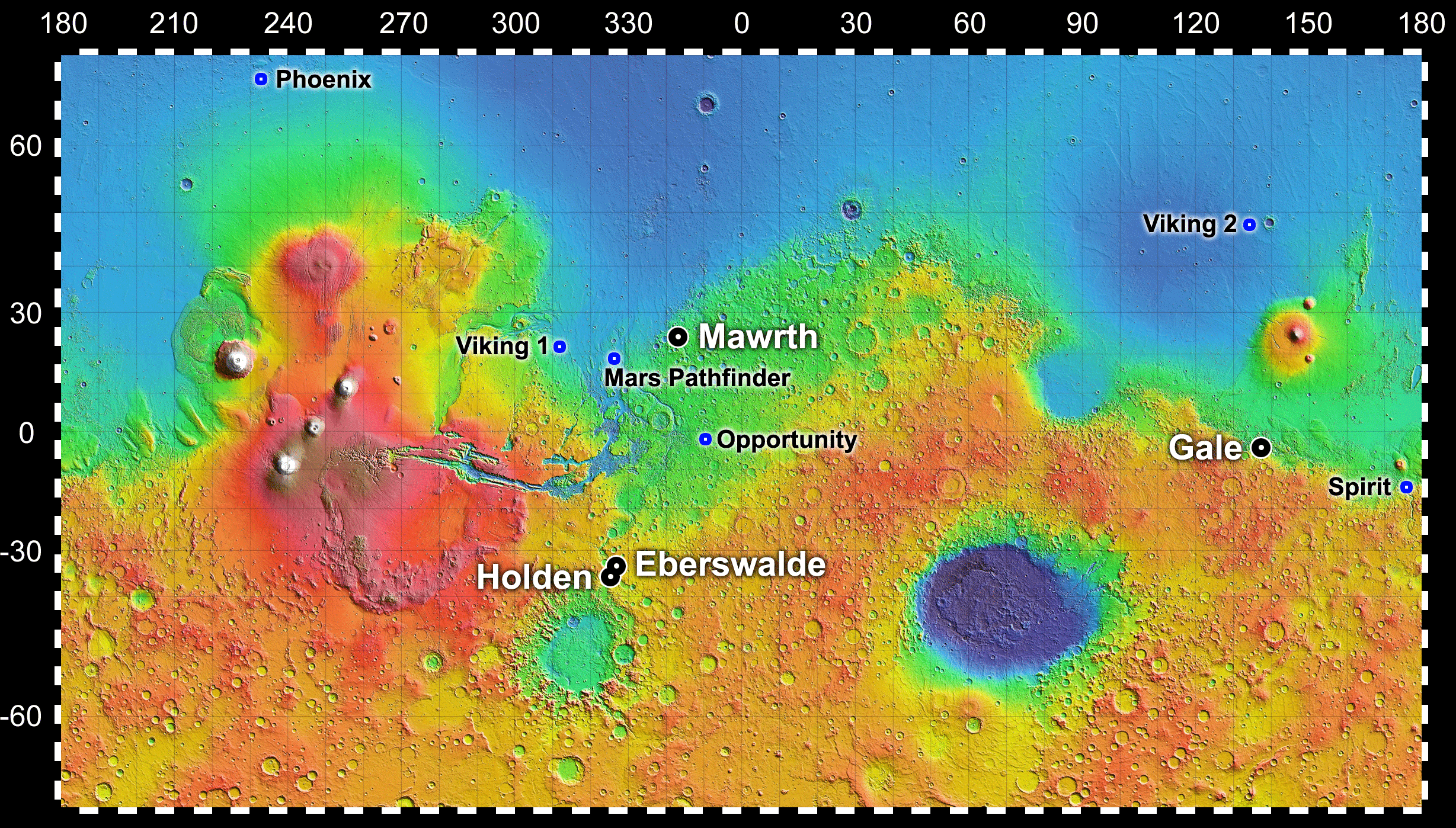
Map of actual (and proposed) Rover landing sites including Gale Crater.

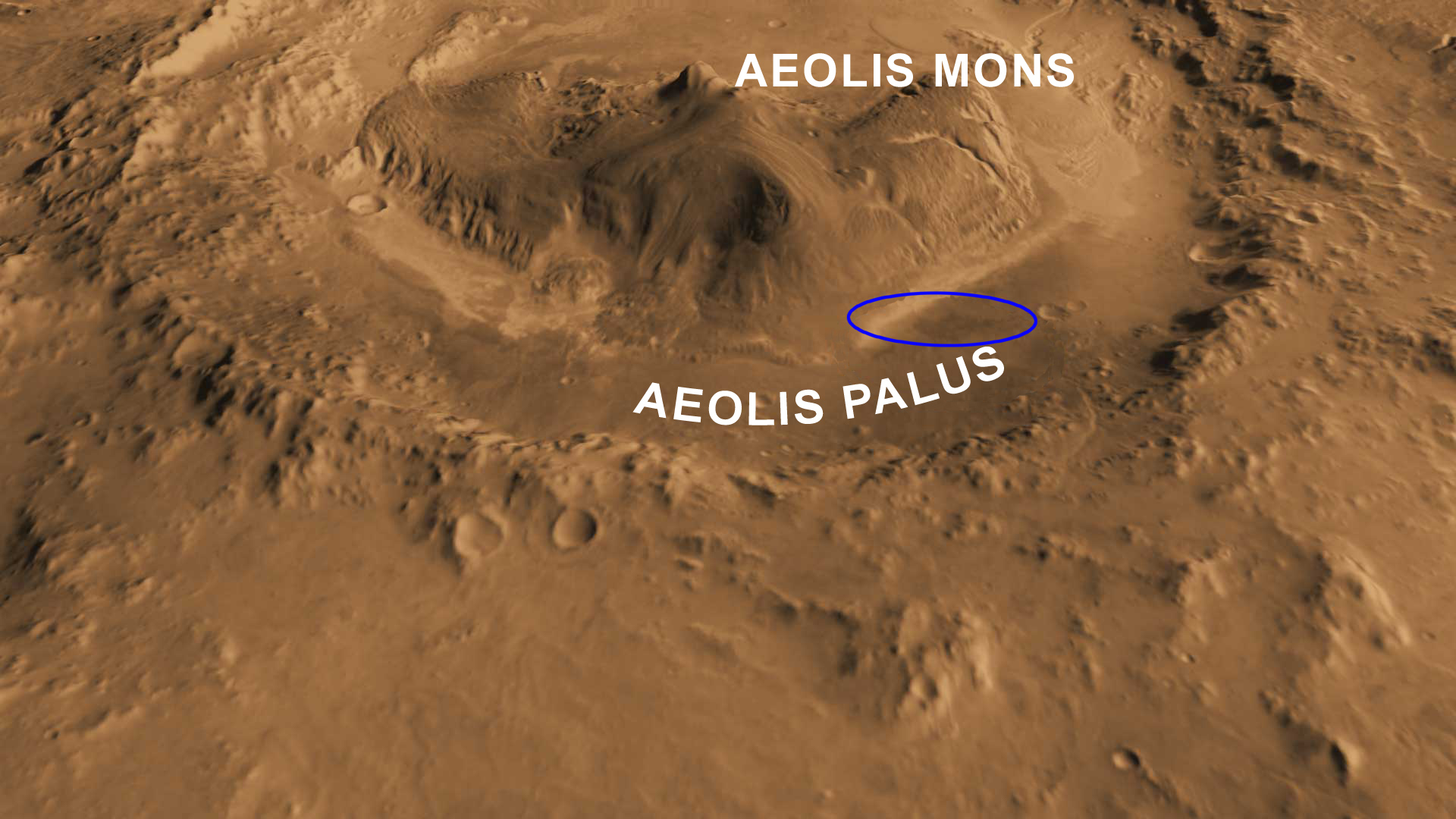
Gale Crater - Landing site is within Aeolis Palus near Aeolis Mons ("Mount Sharp") - North is down.

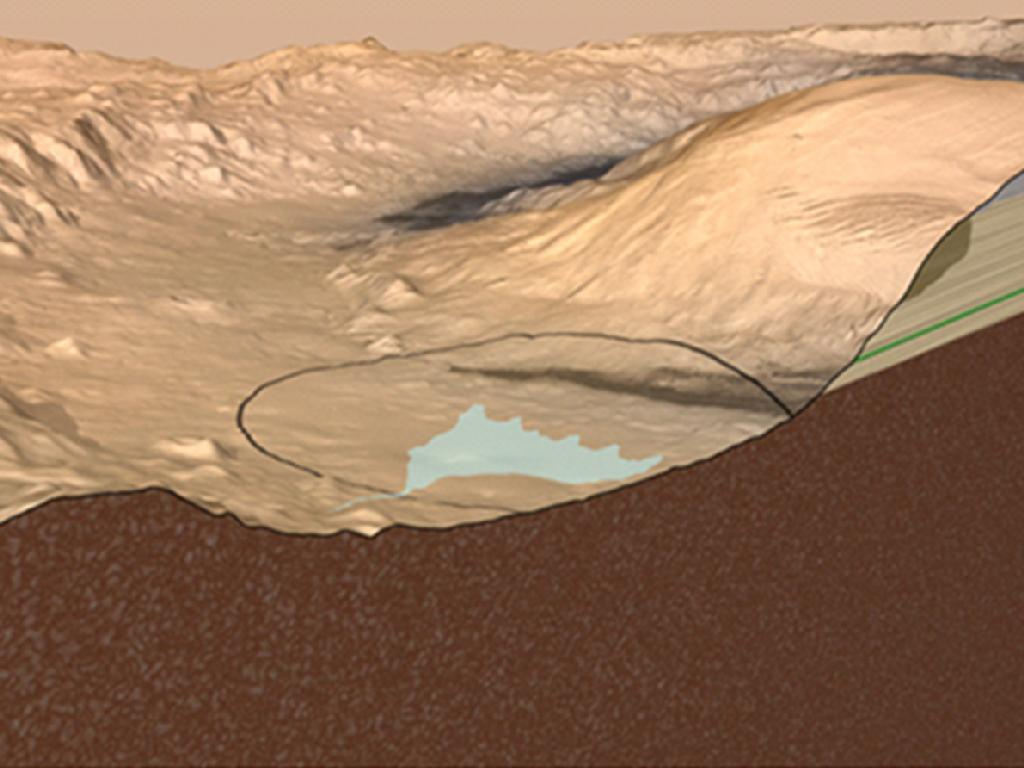
Gale Crater - Landing site is noted - also, alluvial fan (blue) and sediment layers in Aeolis Mons (cutaway).

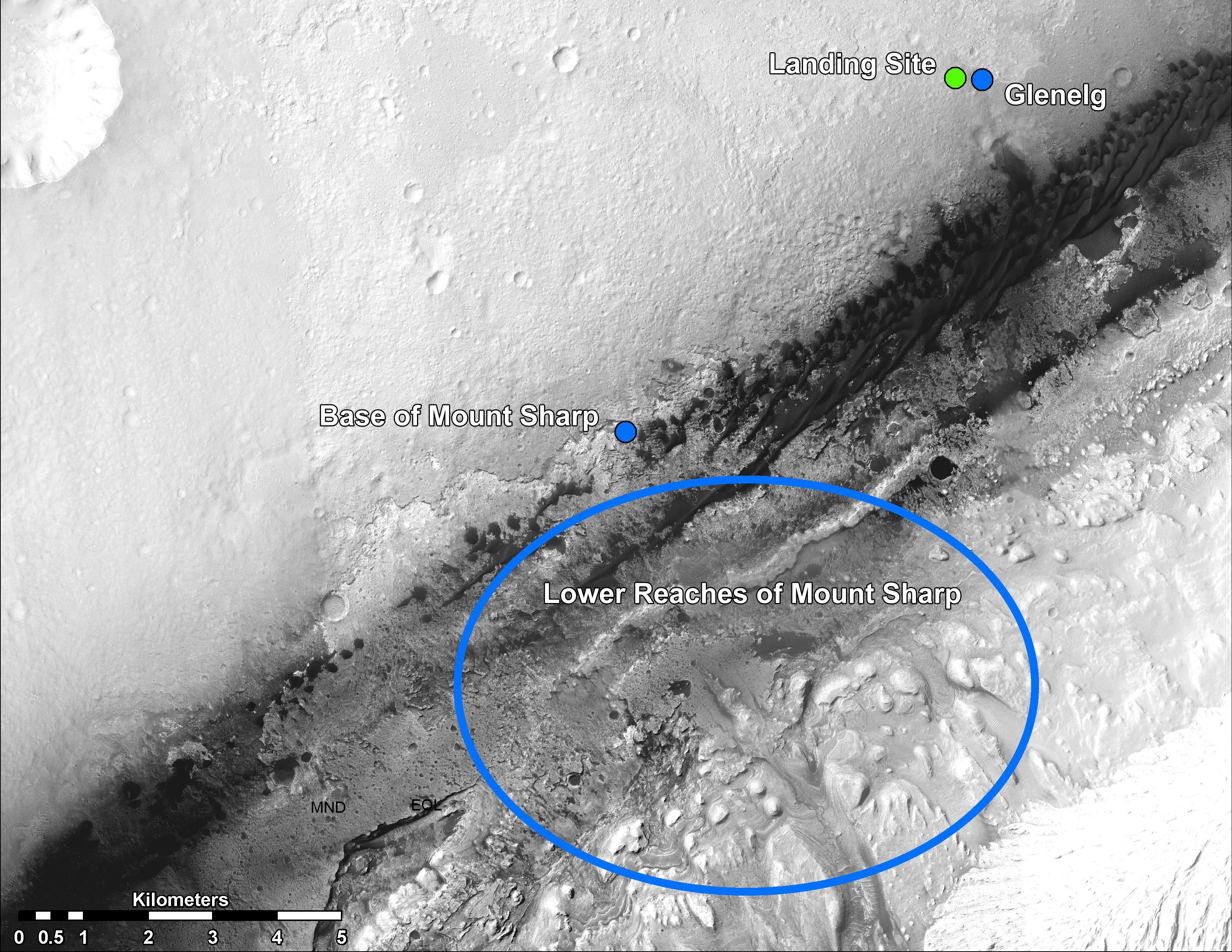
Curiosity rover landing site (green dot) - Blue dot marks Glenelg Intrigue - Blue spot marks "Base of Mount Sharp" - a planned area of study.

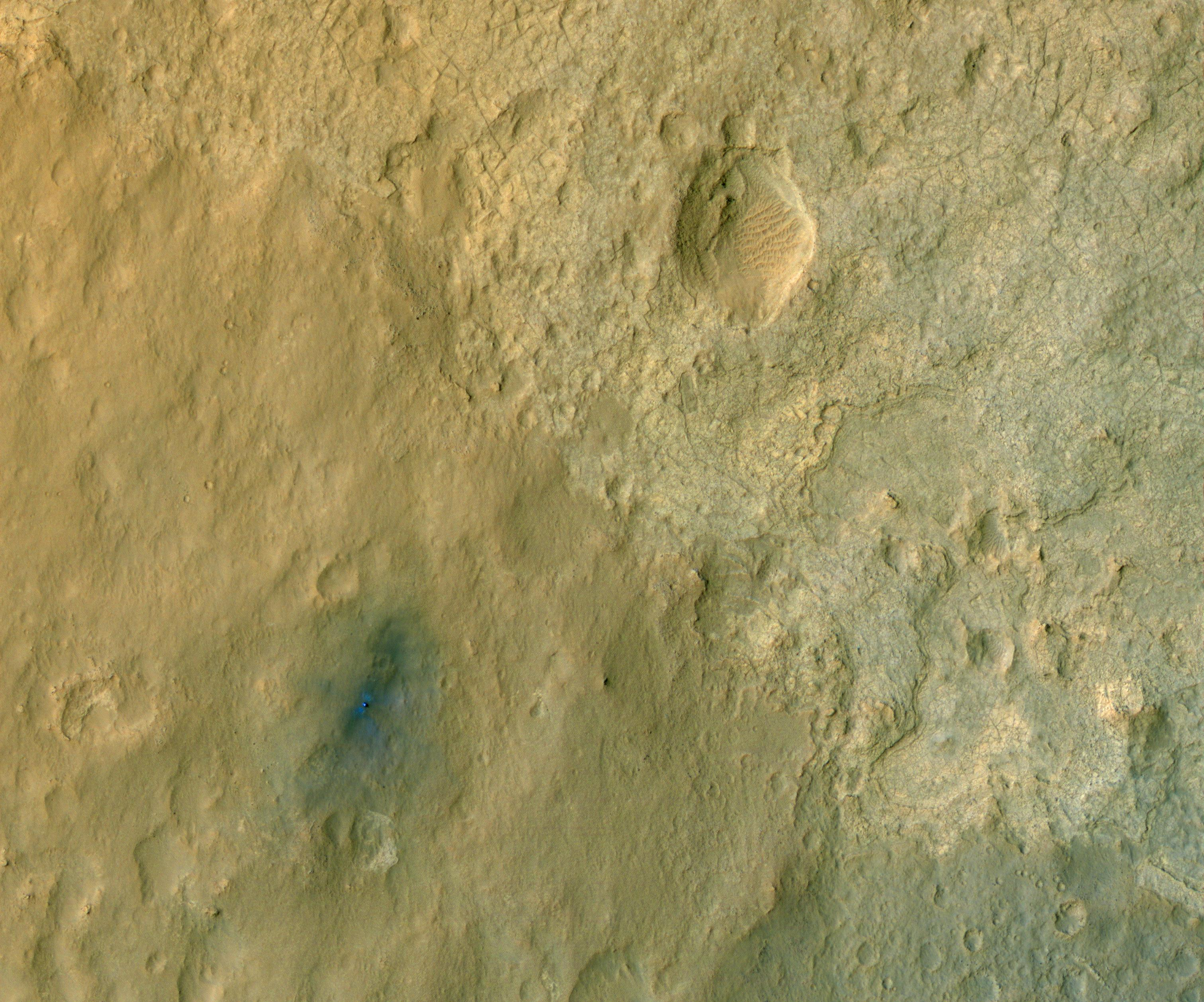
Curiosity rover landing site ("Bradbury Landing") viewed by HiRISE (MRO) (August 14, 2012).

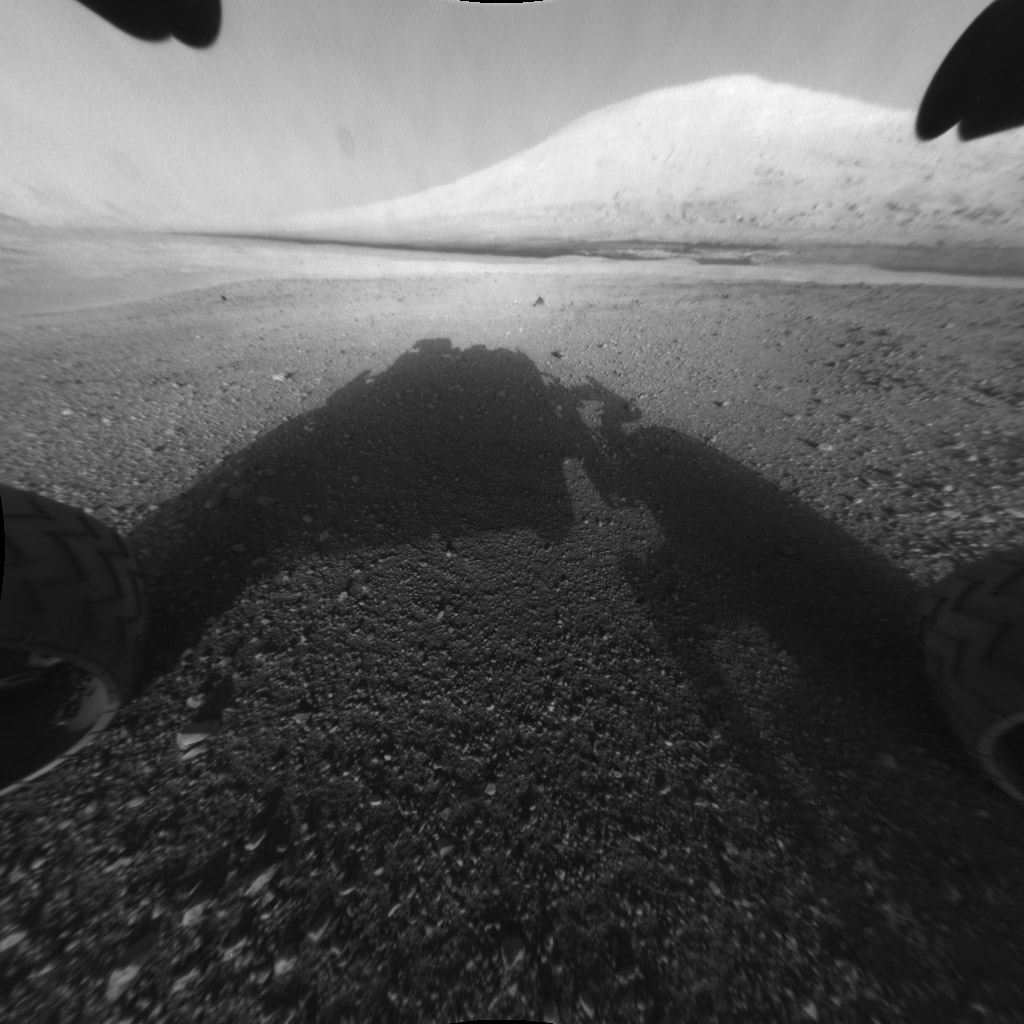
Aeolis Palus and "Mount Sharp" in Gale Crater as viewed by the Curisoity (August 6, 2012).

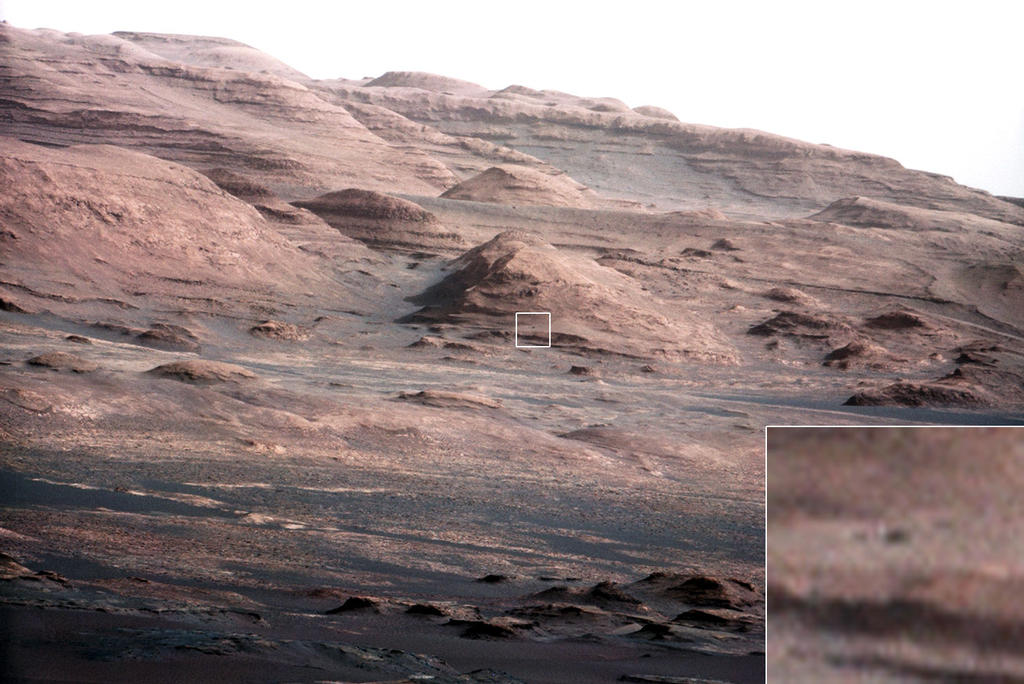
Layers at the base of Aeolis Mons - dark rock in inset is same size as the Curiosity rover (white balanced image).

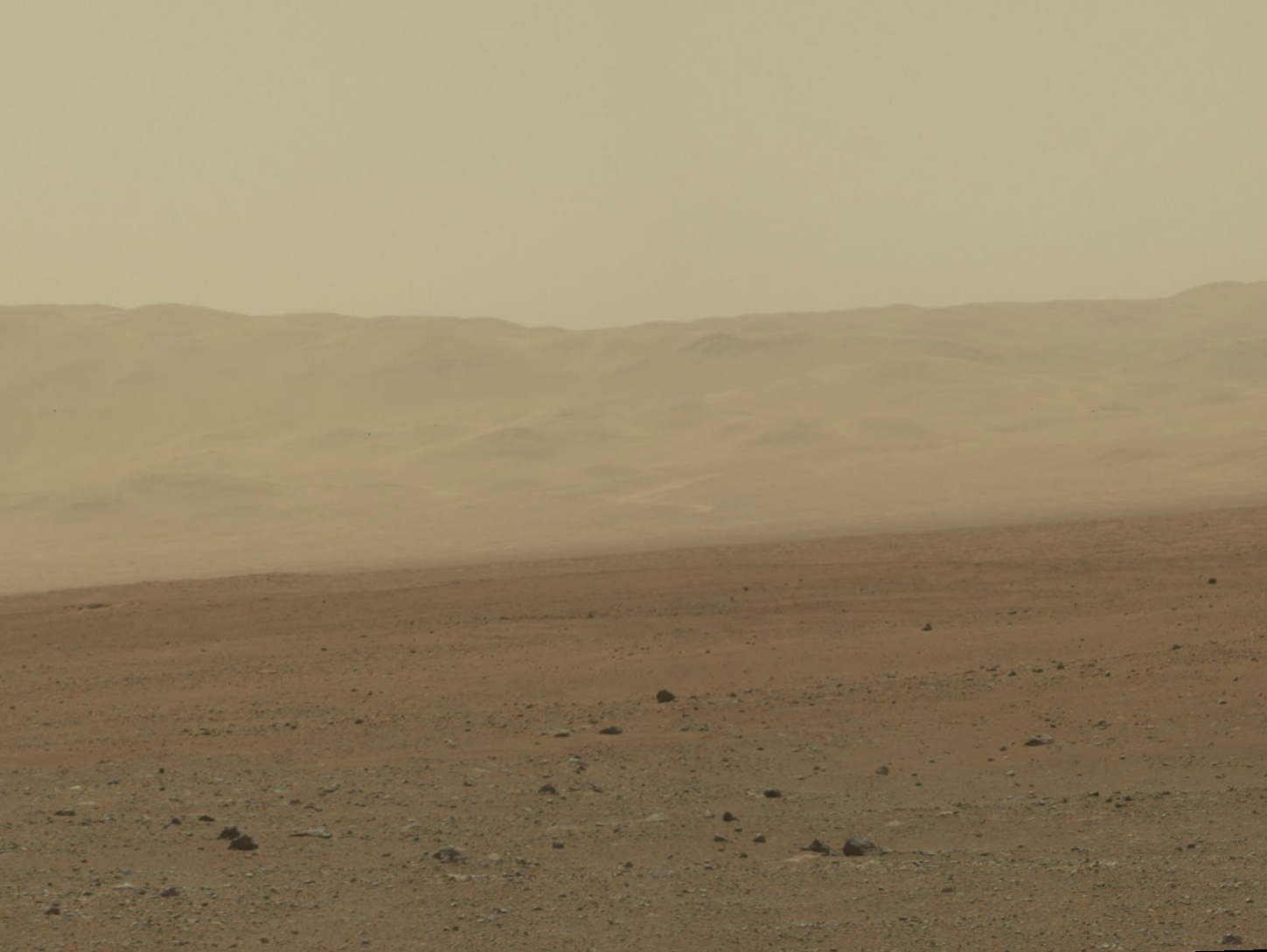
Gale Crater rim about 18 km (11 mi) North of the Curiosity rover (August 9, 2012).

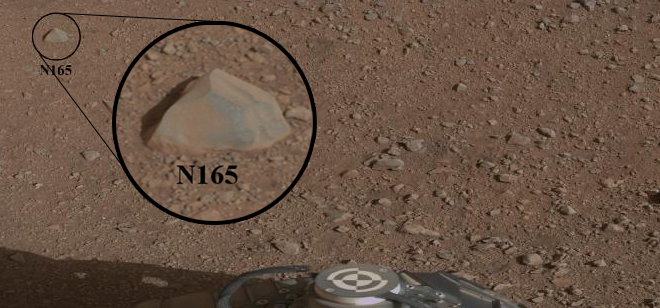
"Coronation" rock on Mars - first target of the ChemCam laser analyzer on the Curiosity rover (August 19, 2012).

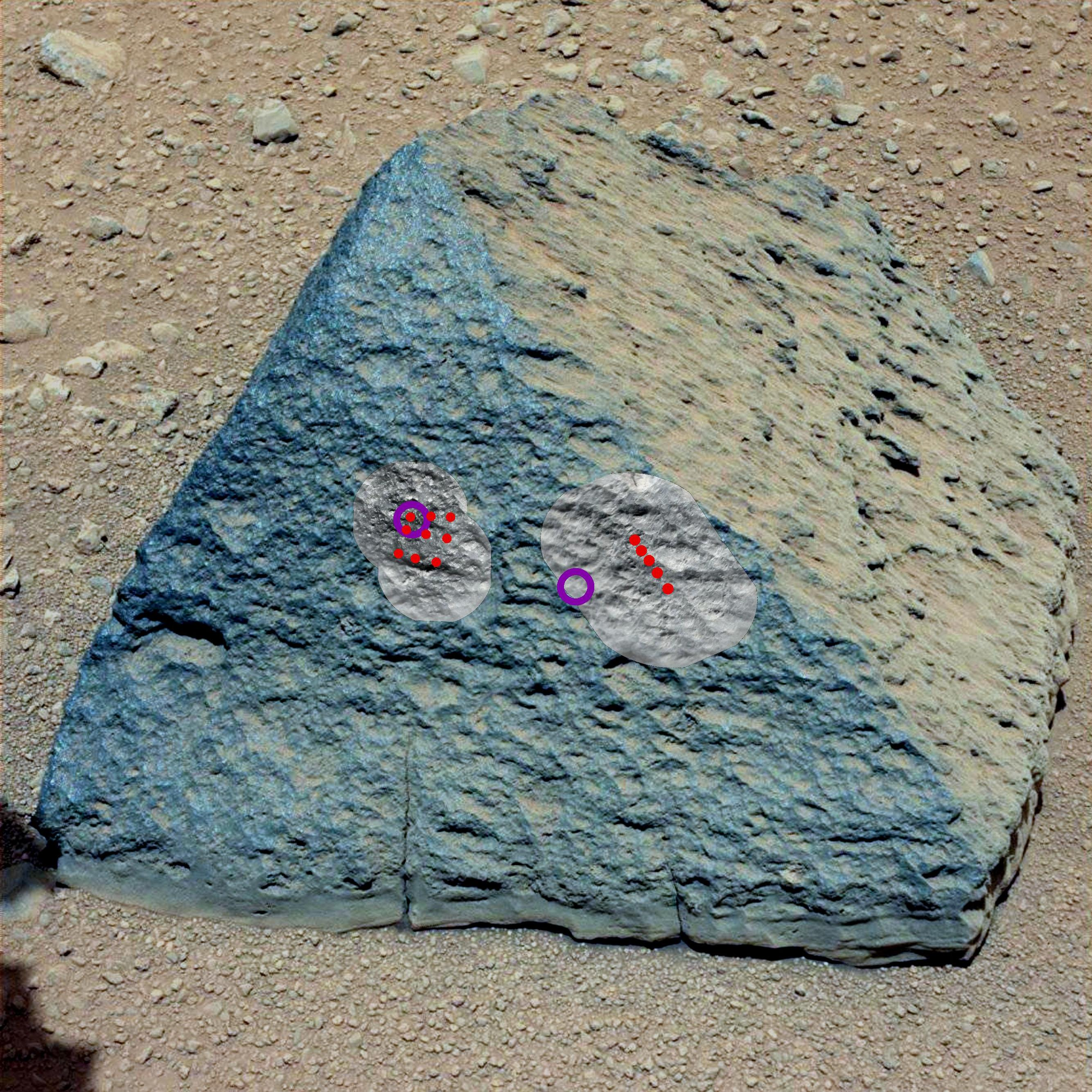
"Jake Matijevic" rock on Mars - a target of the APSX and ChemCam instruments on the Curiosity rover (September 22, 2012).

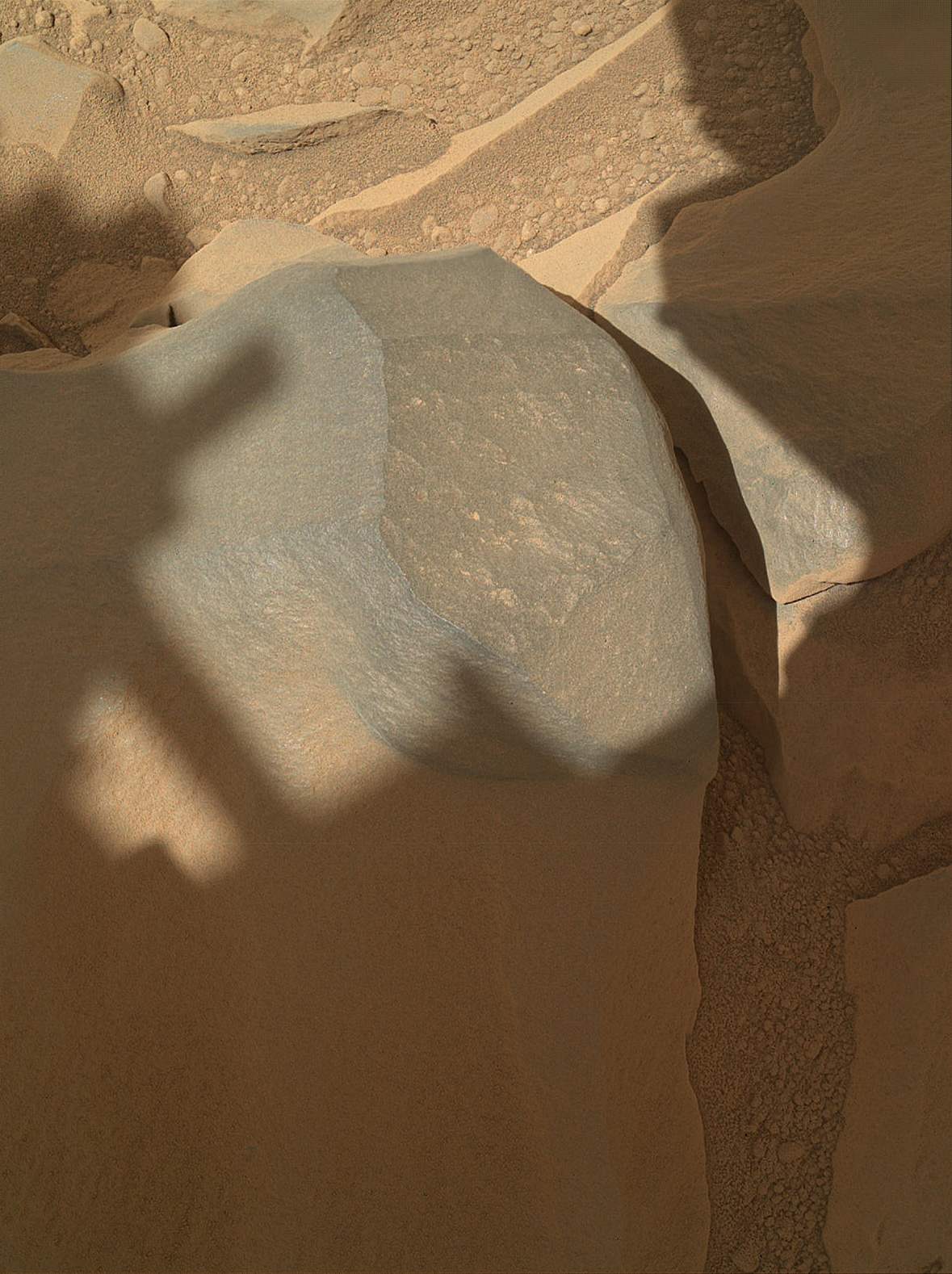
"Bathurst Inlet" rock on Mars - as viewed by the MAHLI camera on the Curiosity rover (September 30, 2012).

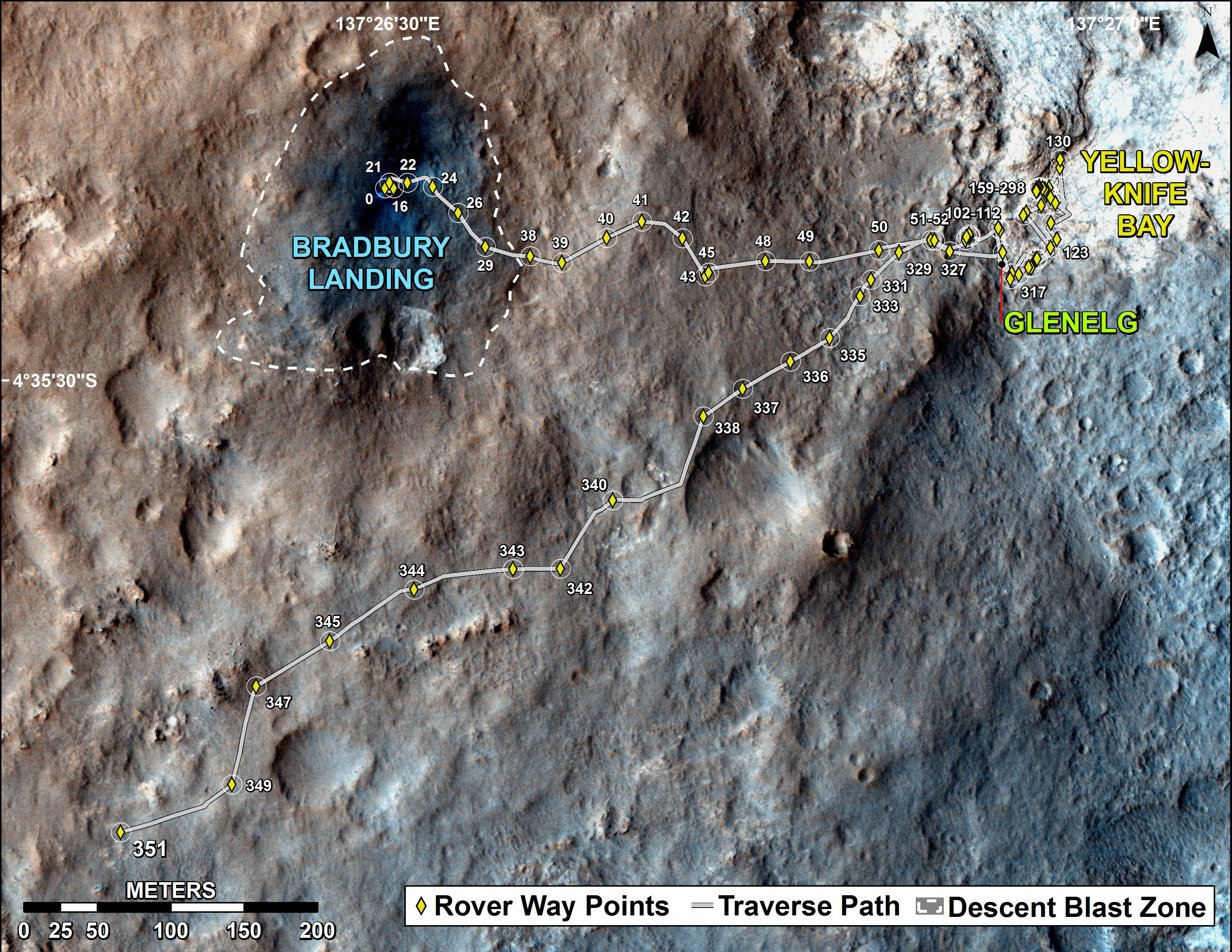
First-Year & First-Mile Traverse Map of the Curiosity rover on Mars (August 1, 2013) (3-D).

== See also ==
- Carbonates on Mars
- Chloride-bearing deposits on Mars
- Columbia Hills (Mars)
- Geology of Mars
- Groundwater on Mars
- List of quadrangles on Mars
- List of rocks on Mars
- Margaritifer Sinus quadrangle
- Martian soil
- Mineralogy of Mars
- Ore resources on Mars
- Water on Mars
