= Antoniadi (Martian crater) =

Crater on Mars

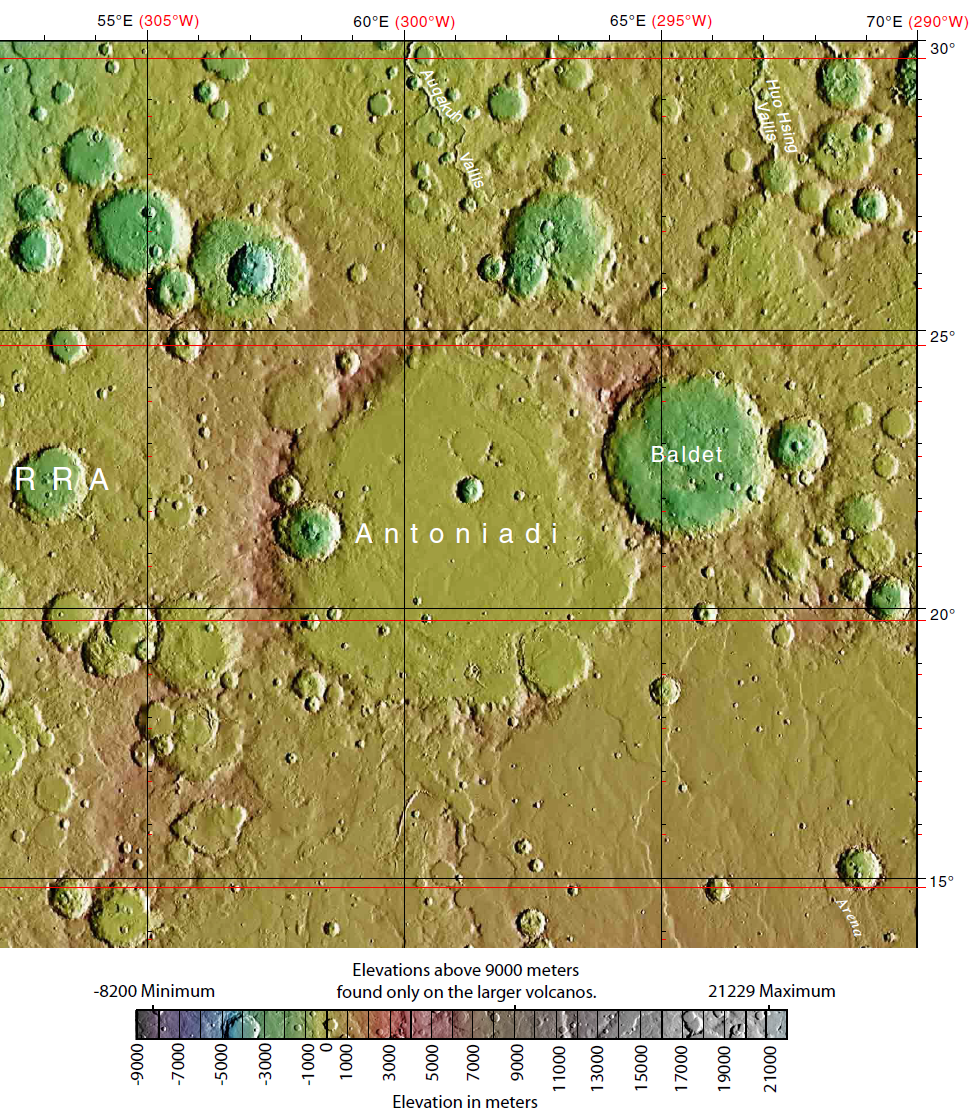
- Planet: Mars
- Region: Syrtis Major Planum
- Coordinates: 21.5°N 299.2°W
- Quadrangle: Syrtis Major
- Diameter: 394.0 km (244.8 mi)
- Eponym: Eugène Michel Antoniadi

Antoniadi is a crater on Syrtis Major Planum in the Syrtis Major quadrangle, Mars, located at 21.5° north latitude and 299.2° west longitude. It is 394 km (245 mi) long and was named after Eugène Michael Antoniadi, a Greek astronomer (1870–1944) who spent most of his life in France.

There is evidence that Antoniadi Crater once contained rivers and lakes. The picture below shows an inverted channel in Antoniadi, as seen by HiRISE. Inverted channels formed from accumulated sediments that were cemented by minerals. These channels eroded into the surface, then the whole area was covered over with sediments. When the sediments were later eroded away, the place where the river channel existed remained because the hardened material were resistant to erosion.

== Inverted relief ==
Some places on Mars show inverted relief. In these locations, a stream bed may be a raised feature, instead of a valley. The inverted former stream channels may be caused by the deposition of large rocks or due to cementation. In either case erosion would erode the surrounding land and leave the old channel as a raised ridge because the ridge will be more resistant to erosion. An image below, taken with HiRISE of Antoniadi Crater shows sinuous ridges that are old channels that have become inverted.

Inverted relief in the form of sinuous and meandering ridges, which are indicative of ancient, inverted fluvial channels, is argued to be evidence of water channels on the Martian surface in the past. Another example of inverted relief on Mars is Miyamoto Crater, which was proposed in 2010 as a potential location to be searched for evidence of life on Mars.

== Gallery ==
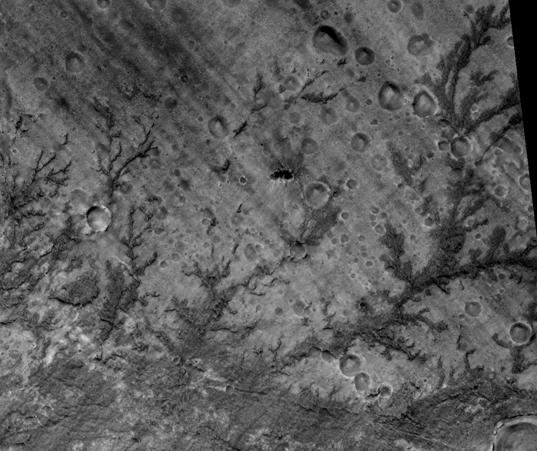
Inverted Stream Channels in Antoniadi Crater, as seen by HiRISE.

== See also ==
- Impact crater
- Impact event
- List of craters on Mars
- Ore resources on Mars
- Planetary nomenclature
- Water on Mars
