= Syrtis Major =

Syrtis Major may refer to:

- Syrtis Major Planum, ancient volcanic area on Mars
- Gulf of Sidra, body of water on the coast of Libya
- "Syrtis Major", an episode of New Captain Scarlet
