= Northeast Syrtis =

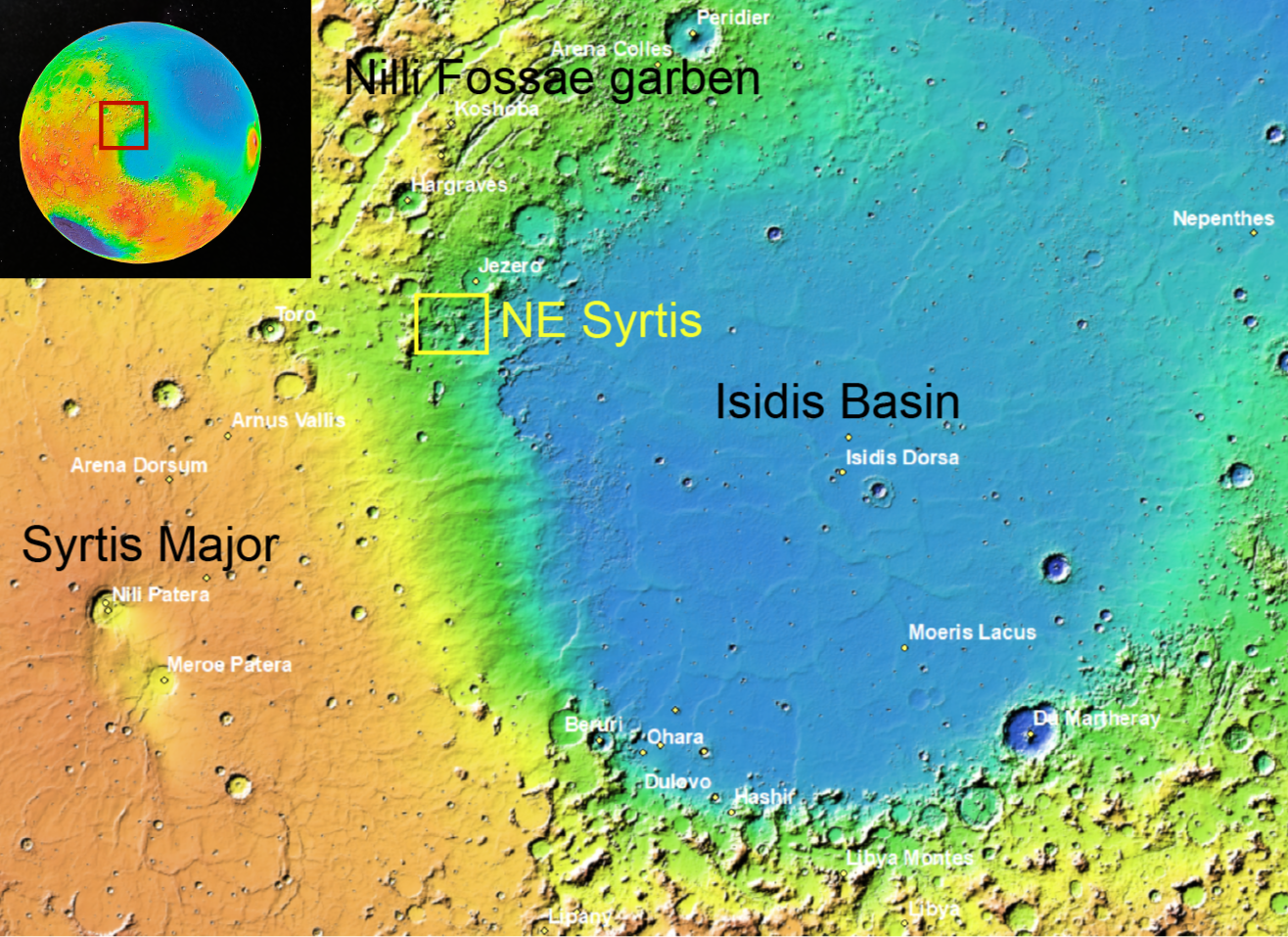
The yellow rectangle indicates the location of Northeast Syrtis Major. Syrtis Major is one of the largest volcanic provinces on Mars. The west part is the ancient and huge impact basin—Isidis, about 1500 km in diameter.

Northeast Syrtis is a region of Mars once considered by NASA as a landing site for the Mars 2020 rover mission. This landing site failed in the competition with Jezero crater, another landing site dozens of kilometers away from Northeast Syrtis. It is located in the northern hemisphere of Mars at coordinates 18°N,77°E in the northeastern part of the Syrtis Major volcanic province, within the ring structure of Isidis impact basin as well. This region contains diverse morphological features and minerals, indicating that water once flowed here. It may be an ancient habitable environment; microbes could have developed and thrived here.

The layered terrain of Northeast Syrtis is unique on the surface of Mars, containing diverse aqueous minerals such as like clay, carbonate, serpentine and sulfate, as well as igneous minerals such as olivine and high-calcium and low-calcium pyroxene. Clay minerals form in the interaction between water and rock and sulfate minerals usually form through intense evaporation on Earth. Similar processes may happen on Mars forming these minerals, which strongly suggests a history of water and rock interaction. In addition, megabreccia, possibly the oldest material throughout this region (some blocks are over 100 m in diameter), could give an insight into the primary crust when Mars first formed. The location is an ideal site for studying the timing and evolution of the surface processes of Mars, such as huge impact basin formation, fluvial activity (valley networks, small outflow channels), groundwater activity, history of glaciation, and volcanic activity.

== Regional stratigraphy ==
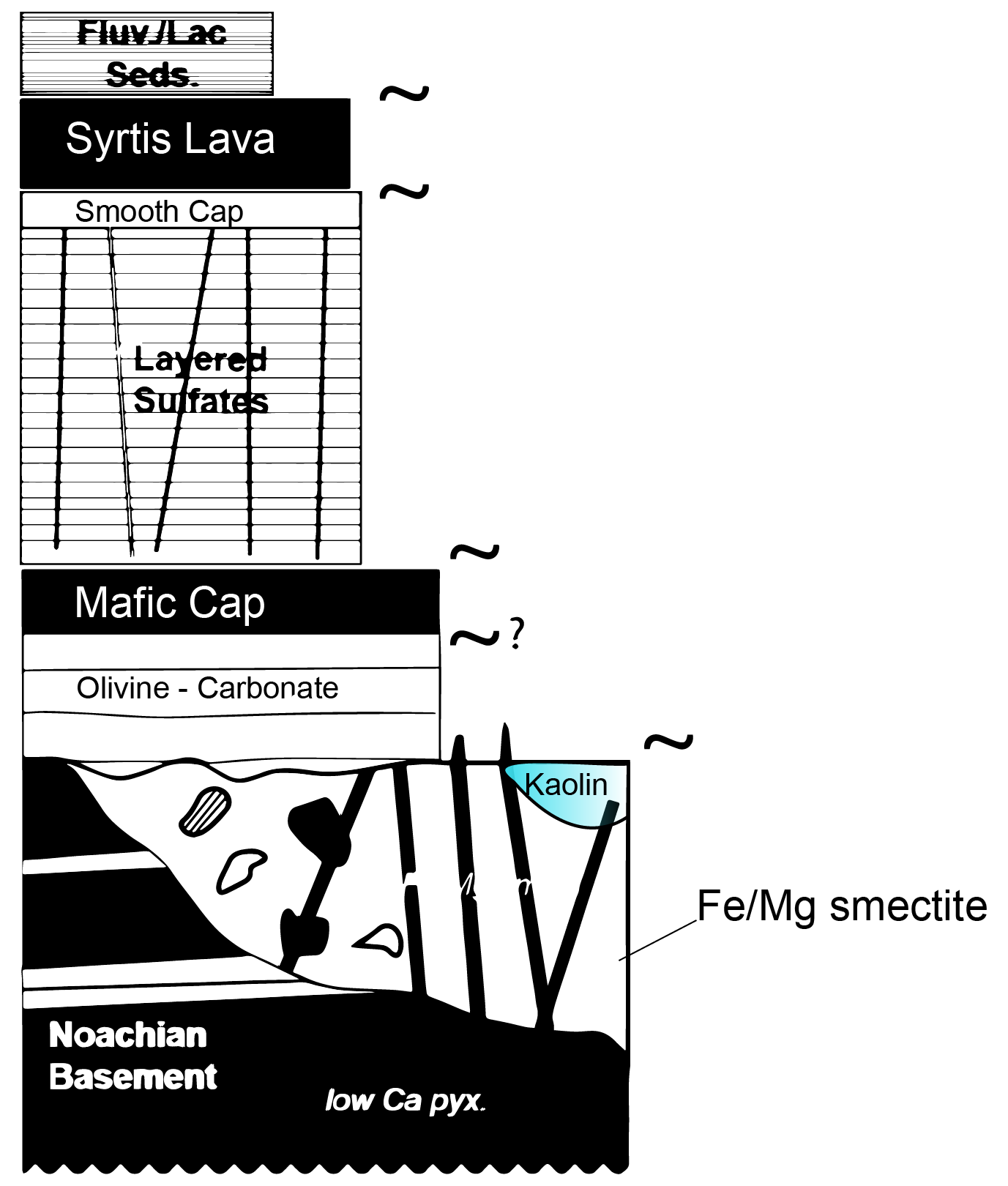
The stratigraphic column of Northeast Syrtis. The thickness of each unit is hard to estimate. after

The regional stratigraphy of Northeast Syrtis has been studied in detail. This area is sandwiched between a huge shield volcano—Syrtis Major—and one of largest impact basins in the Solar System, and therefore could provide a key constraint of the timing of key events in the history of Mars. The stratigraphy can be divided into four major units, from young to old:

1. Syrtis Major lavas unit contains high-calcium pyroxene bearing material;
2. Layered sulfate-bearing unit, include poly-hydrated sulfates and jarosite;
3. Olivine unit, olivine-enriched unit variably altered to carbonate and serpentine;
4. Basement unit: The mixture of iron/magnesium (Fe/Mg) smectite and low-calcium pyroxene-bearing unit variably altered to Aluminium-clay bearing materials.

The basement unit is one of newest units on Mars, recording early-stage evolution history of terrestrial planets. The change from carbonate to sulfate indicates a transition from alkaline-neutral to acid aqueous environments.

== Mars 2020 mission ==
The Mars 2020 rover launched in July 2020 with Atlas V rocket to reach Mars in February 2021. This rover inherits from the Mars Science Laboratory Curiosity, with similar entry, descent, and landing systems, and the sky crane. Besides exploring a likely habitable site and searching for signs of past life, collecting scientifically compelling samples (rock and regolith) which could address fundamental scientific questions if returned to Earth, is the main goal of the Mars 2020 mission. The landing site's selection is the key part of this mission's success.

Although Northeast Syrtis survived the cut in third Mars 2020 Landing Site Workshops, it failed final completion. The landing ellipse of Northeast Syrtis is 16 x 14 km and the smaller ellipse is 13.3 × 7.8 km with the help of advanced technologyTerrain-Relative Navigation (TRN).

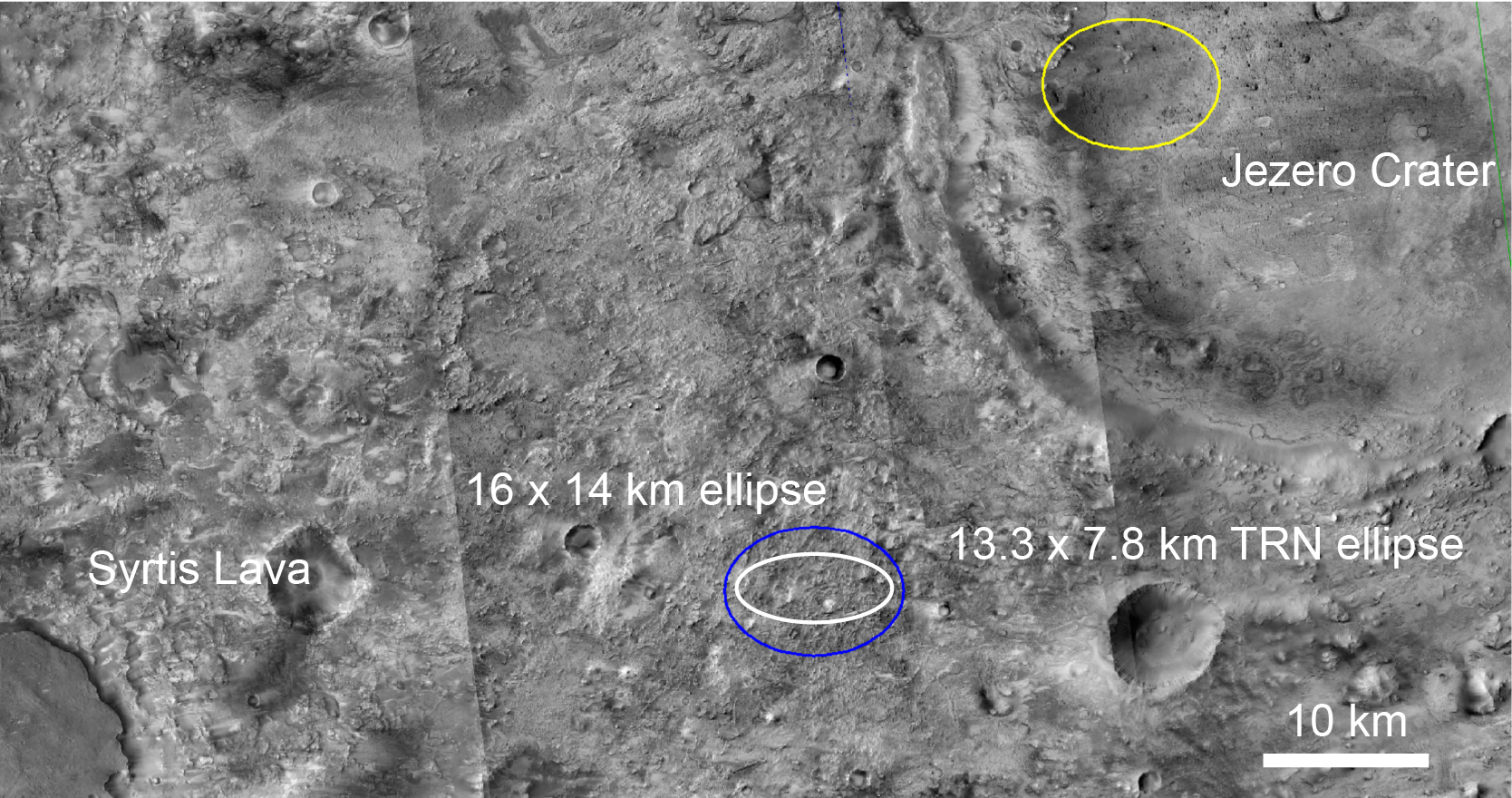
Landing ellipse of NE Syrtis, Mars. The blue oval is Northeast Syrtis landing ellipse. The white oval is the smaller anding ellipse with Terrain-Relative Navigation technique. The yellow oval is another potential landing site, Jezero landing ellipse. The context image is CTX (Context Camera) onboard Mars Reconnaissance Orbiter.

=== Region of interest ===
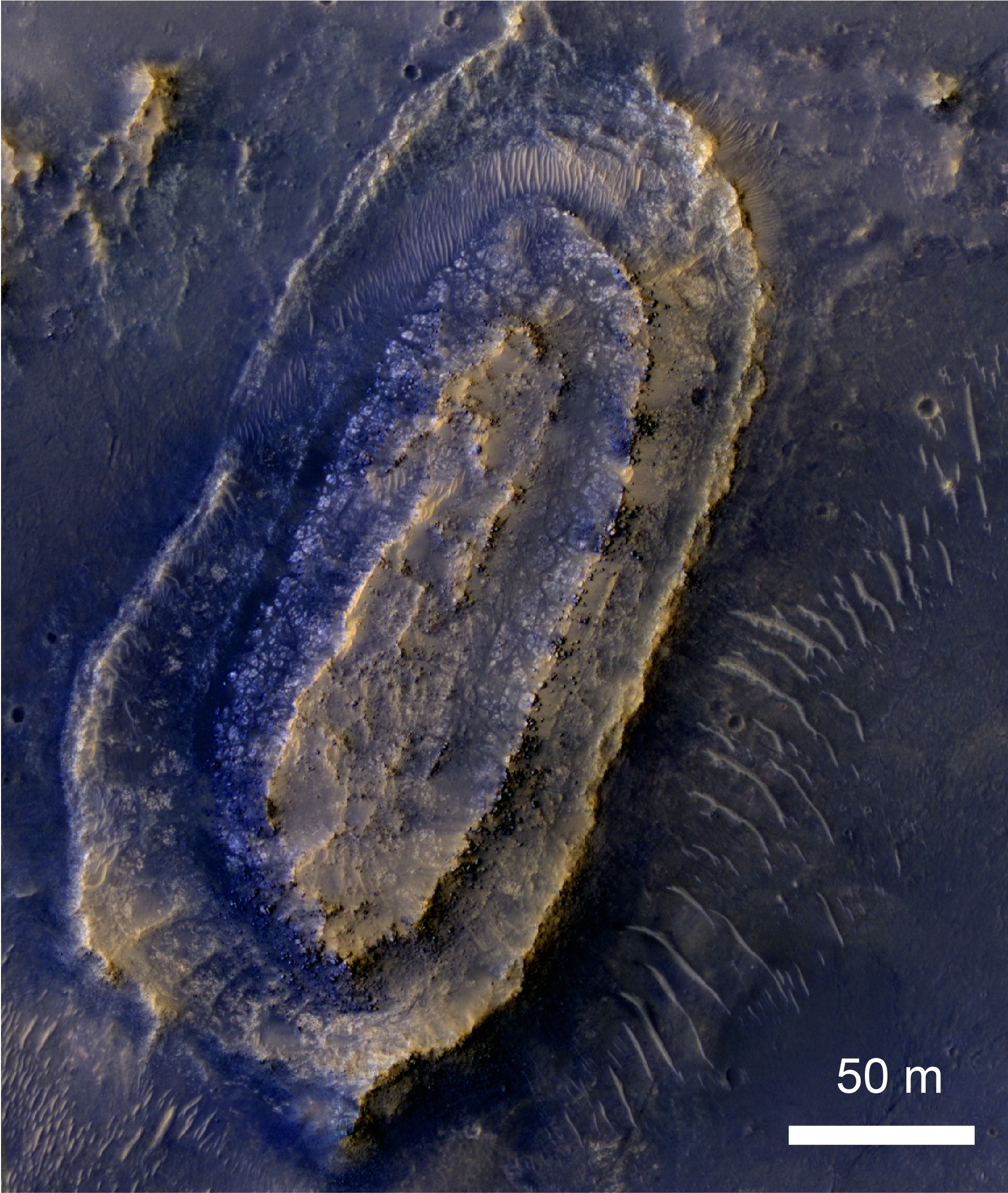
Mesa unit in Northeast Syrtis, Mars.

==== Mesa unit ====
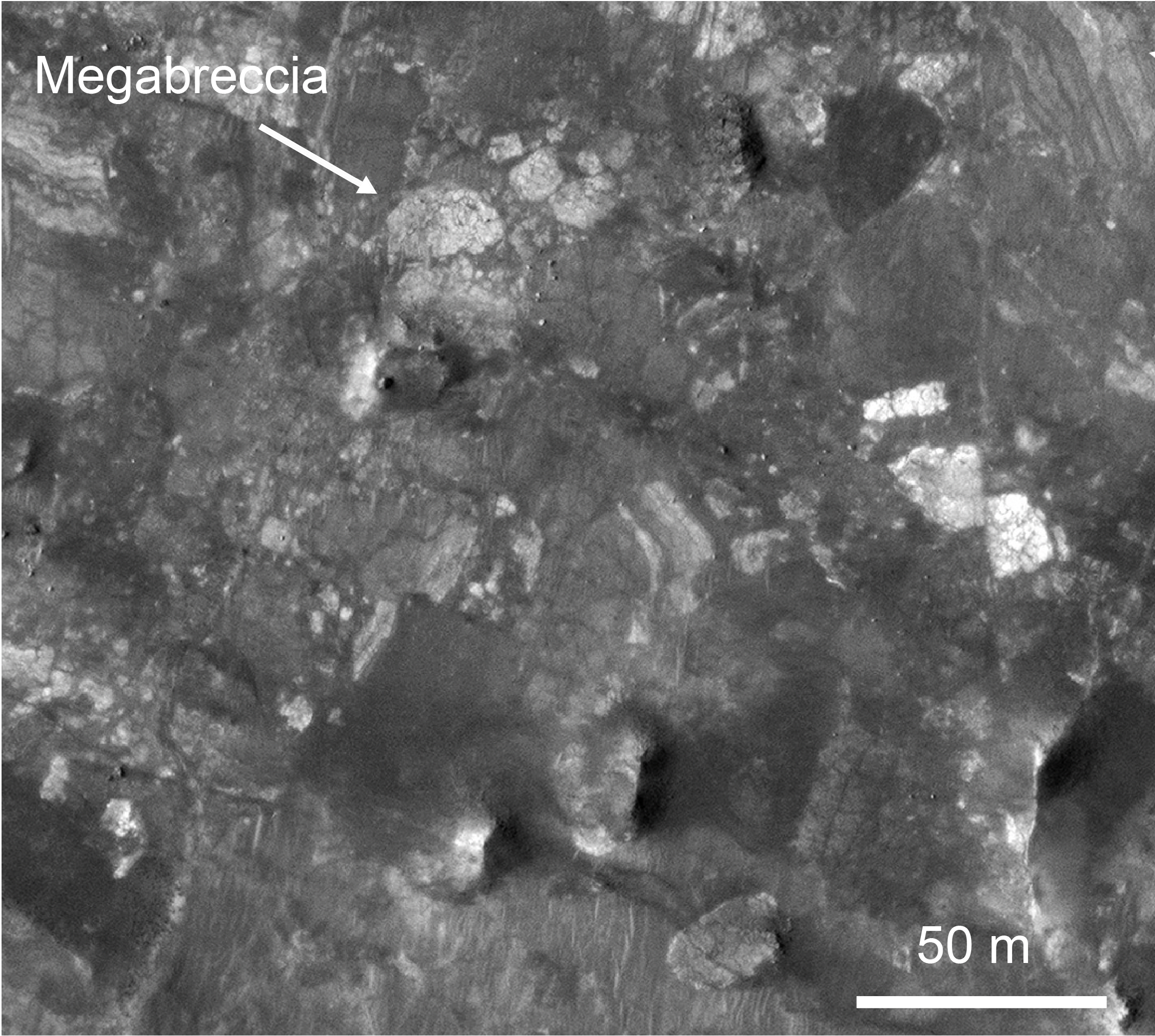
Megabreccia in Northeast Syrtis.

The mesa is one of the interesting locations. It consists of five subunits: crater-retaining cap, boulder-shedding slopes exposing lightened blocks, olivine-carbonate unit, Fe/Mg-phyllosilicate, allowing easy to access diverse rocks.

On the top of the mesa is a dark toned cap unit, composed of meter-scale boulders. It was interpreted as Hesperian Syrtis Major lava flows or lithified ash. These igneous rocks are suitable samples for acquiring the age of Martian geologic events, which could calibrate the planet dating method. Unlike Earth, planet dating mainly relies on crater counting, a method based on the assumption that the number of impact craters on a planet surface increases with the length of time that the surface has been exposed to space cratering, calibrated using the ages obtained by radiometric dating of samples of Luna and Apollo missions. The samples of this mission returned to Earth will be analyzed by state of the art equipment in laboratories. Igneous samples from Northeast Syrtis could provide four key time for Martian geology history, including (1) the timing of Isidis impact event, (2) the timing of emplacement of olivine-rich unit, (3) the timing of dark-toned mafic cap rock, (4) the timing of Syrtis lava flows, which would fundamentally improve human knowledge of early Mars and the early history of solar system, such as the late-heavy bombardment.

This region exposes the largest high-olivine abundance rocks on Mars. The origin of high-olivine rock is still in debate. Impact cumulates or olivine-rich lava are two leading hypotheses. A portion of olivine rock was altered to carbonate. Many hypotheses have been proposed to explain the origin of carbonate, including a serpentine springs system. Carbonate is important sink of carbon, and is a crucial part of understanding the carbon cycle of Mars. Future sample return could shed light on the environmental conditions of carbonate. As well, the isotopic composition of carbonate through time, records the atmosphere loss, and it also reveals whether life once emerged on Mars.

The lower part of mesa unit is the basement unit of the Northeast Syrtis region, consisting of Fe/Mg smectites and low calcium pyroxene. The basement unit was partially altered to form kaolinite. The kaolinite (Al-clay) usually overlying the Fe/Mg smectites across the Martian surface. Weathering in a warm climate or acid leaching are two domain interpretations of kaolinite formation.

===== Megabreccia =====
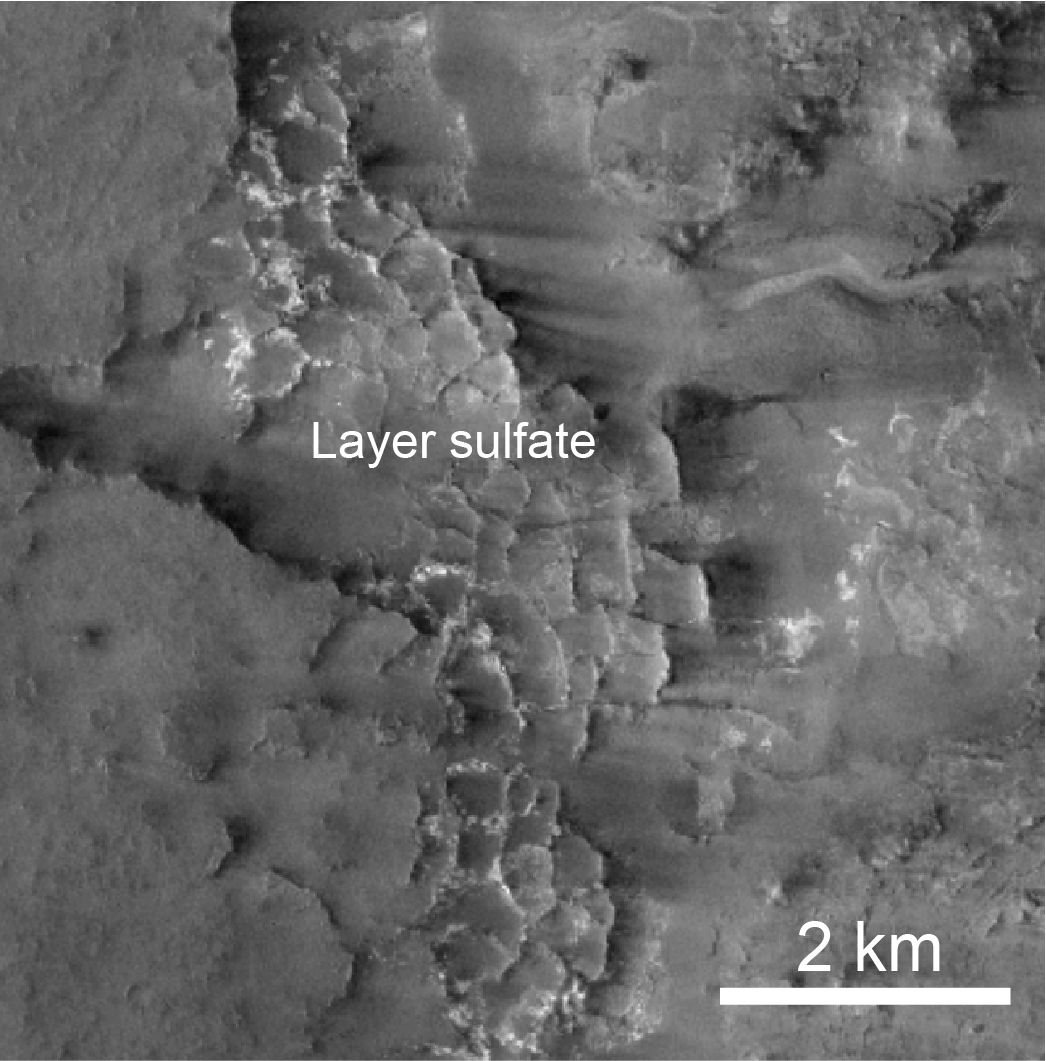
Layer sulfate unit in Northeast Syrtis.

Megabreccia occurs throughout the basement unit of Northeast Syrtis. The composition of these megabreccias is complex, including altered or mafic material. These megabreccias may be uplifted and exposed by the Isidis Basin forming event. The megabreccia could reveal the nature of the remnant of Mars's primary crust or the Noachian-aged low-calcium pyroxene lavas. It also could constrain the timing of Martian dynamo activity.

==== Layer sulfate unit ====
Further to the south of the landing ellipse, there is a 500-metre (1,600 ft) thick sequence of sulfate deposits capped by lava flows from the later Syrtis Major volcanic formation. The layer of sulfates include poly-hydrated sulphates and jarosite. Jarosite usually indicate oxidizing and acid (pH<4) environments. The occurrence of jarosite indicates that the environment changed from neutral/alkaline (as suggested by extensive Fe/Mg smectites and carbonate) to acid. The detection of sulfate adds more complexity to Martian geologic history.

== See also ==
- Astrobiology
- Climate of Mars
- Composition of Mars
- Exploration of Mars
- Geology of Mars
- Impact crater
- Inverted relief
- Lakes on Mars
- List of craters on Mars
- Water on Mars
- Mars lander
