= Isidis Planitia =

Crater on Mars

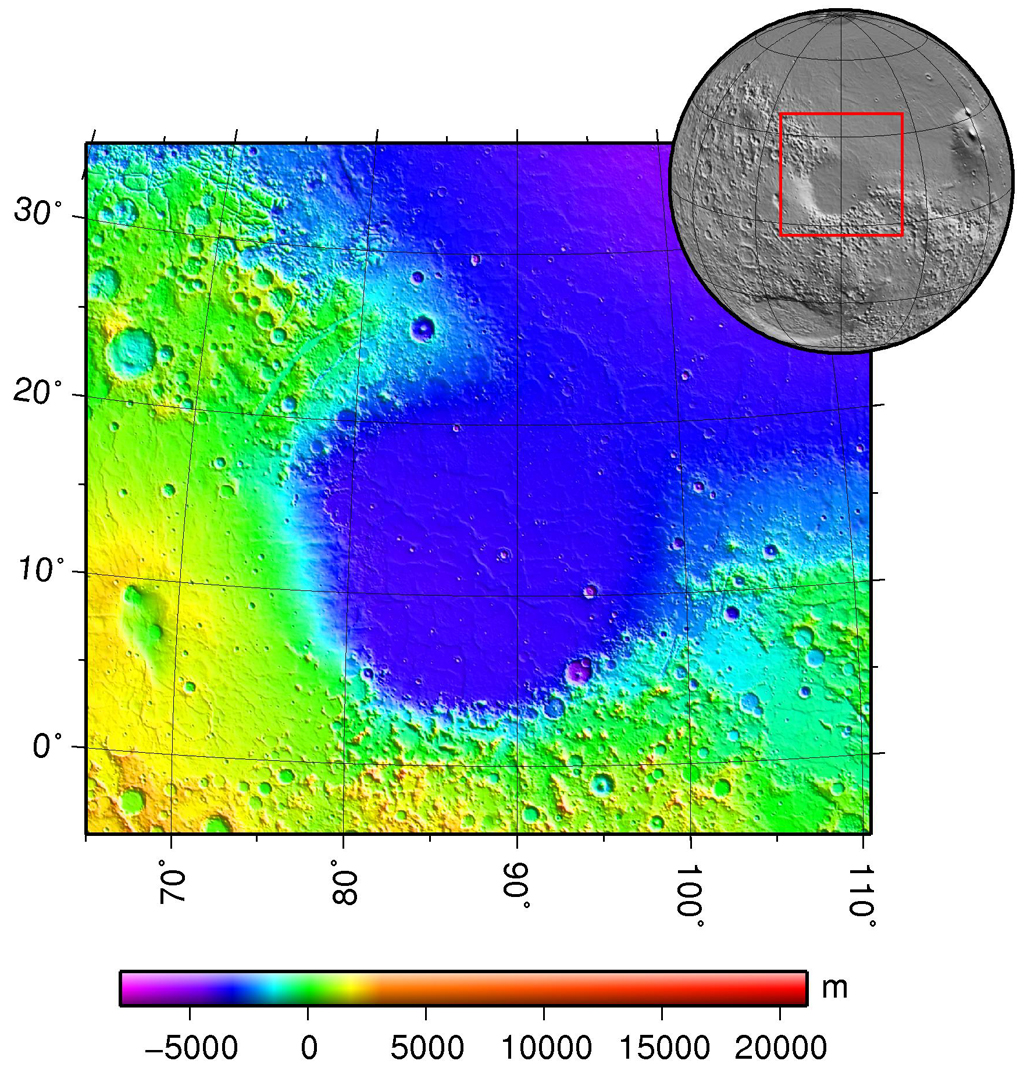
- Topography of Isidis Planitia
- Location: North of Hellas Planitia, east of Syrtis Major Planum, Mars
- Coordinates: 12.9°N 87.0°E
- Diameter: c. 1,900 km (1,200 mi)
- Impactor diameter: c. 200 km
- Age: c. 3.9 billion years
- Eponym: Isis is the Egyptian goddess of heaven and fertility.

Isidis Planitia is a plain located within a giant impact basin on Mars, located partly in the Syrtis Major quadrangle and partly in the Amenthes quadrangle. At approximately 1,900 km (1,200 mi) in diameter, it is the third-largest confirmed impact structure on the planet, after the Hellas and Utopia basins. Isidis was likely the last major basin to be formed on Mars, having formed around 3.9 billion years ago during the Noachian period, by an impactor around 200 kilometres (120 mi) in diameter. Due to dust coverage, it typically appears bright in telescopic views, and was mapped as a classical albedo feature, Isidis Regio, visible by telescope in the pre-spacecraft era.

A study reported in Icarus described the complex geologic history of parts of Isidis, especially areas near the Deuteronilus contact. This contact is the supposed edge of a vast Martian ocean. The researchers found evidence of a Late Hesperian/Early Amazonian Sea in the area. The sea would have quickly frozen over. Eskers formed under the ice.

Just to the west of Isidis is Syrtis Major Planum, a low-relief shield volcano that is a prominent dark albedo feature of Mars, which formed after the basin. The westernmost extent is bounded by a subregion, Northeast Syrtis with diverse geology. Around the Isidis basin magnesium carbonate was found by the Mars Reconnaissance Orbiter. This mineral indicates that water was present and that it was not acidic, pH conditions more favorable for the evolution of life.

The name Isidis Planitia follows the earlier name Isidis Regio ('region of Isis'). Isis is the Egyptian goddess of heaven and fertility.

== Gallery ==
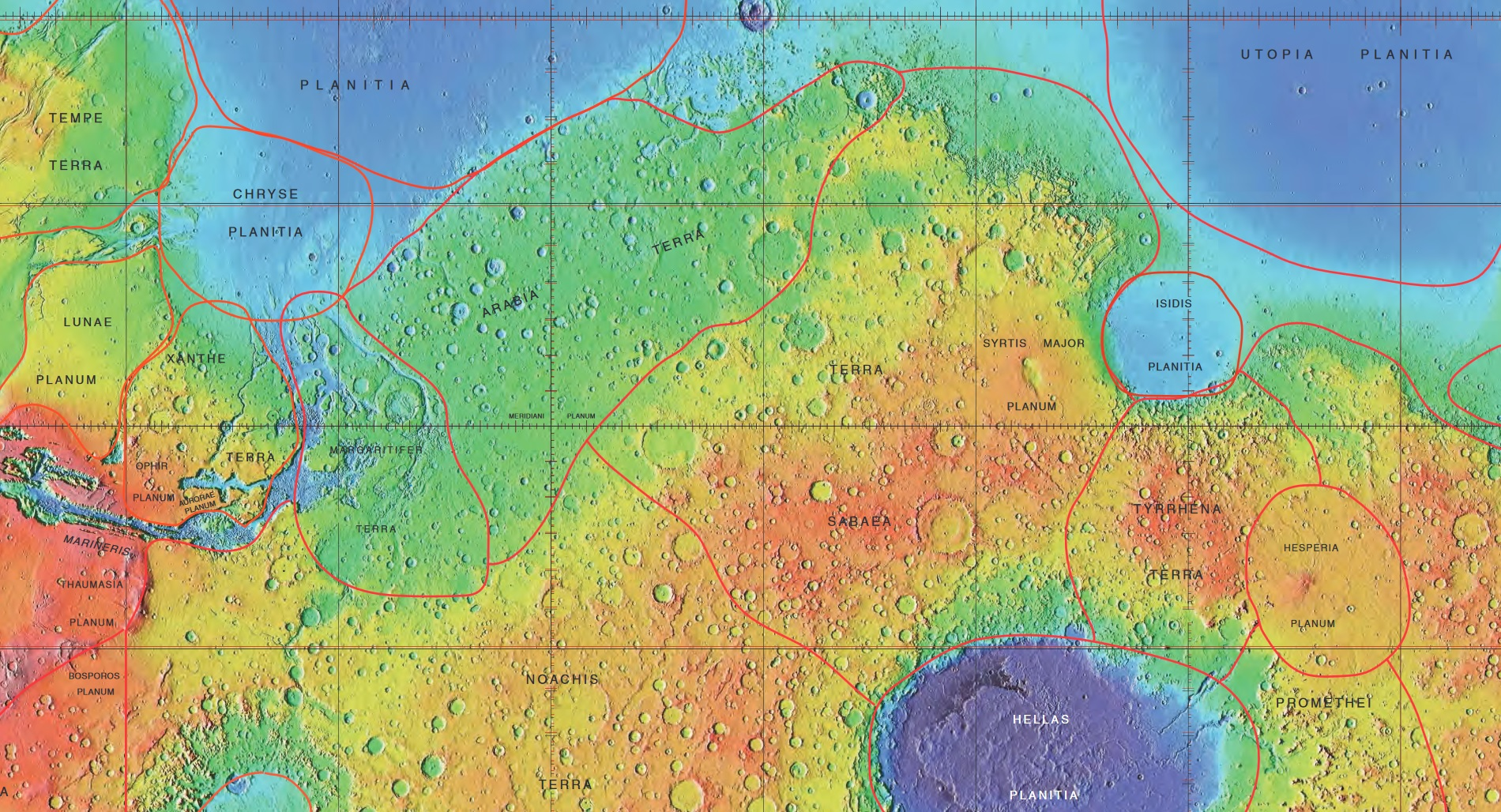
MOLA map showing boundaries of Isidis Planitia and other regions

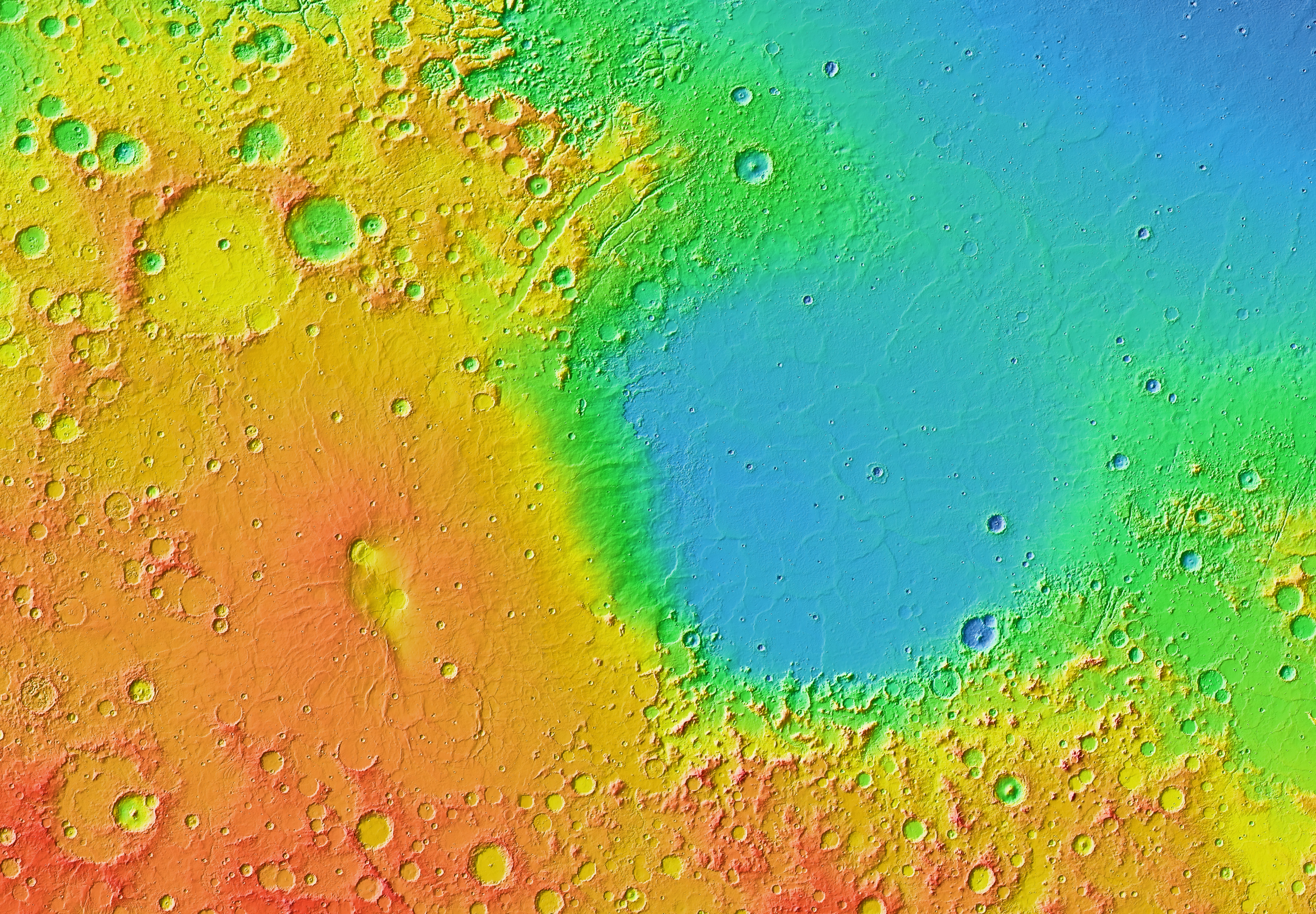
MOLA colorized topographic map showing Isidis Planitia (right) and the adjacent low-relief shield volcano Syrtis Major Planum (left).

== Beagle 2 ==
The Beagle 2 lander was about to land in the eastern part of Isidis Planitia in December 2003, when contact with the craft was lost. In January 2015, NASA reported the Beagle 2 had been found on the surface in Isidis Planitia (location is about 11.5265°N 90.4295°E). High-resolution images captured by the Mars Reconnaissance Orbiter identified the lost probe, which appears to be intact. (see discovery images here)

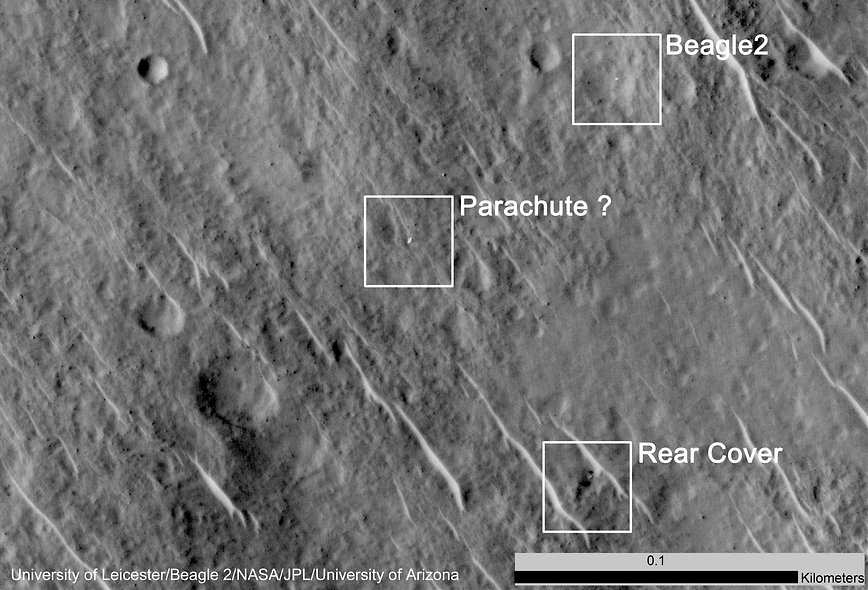
Overview

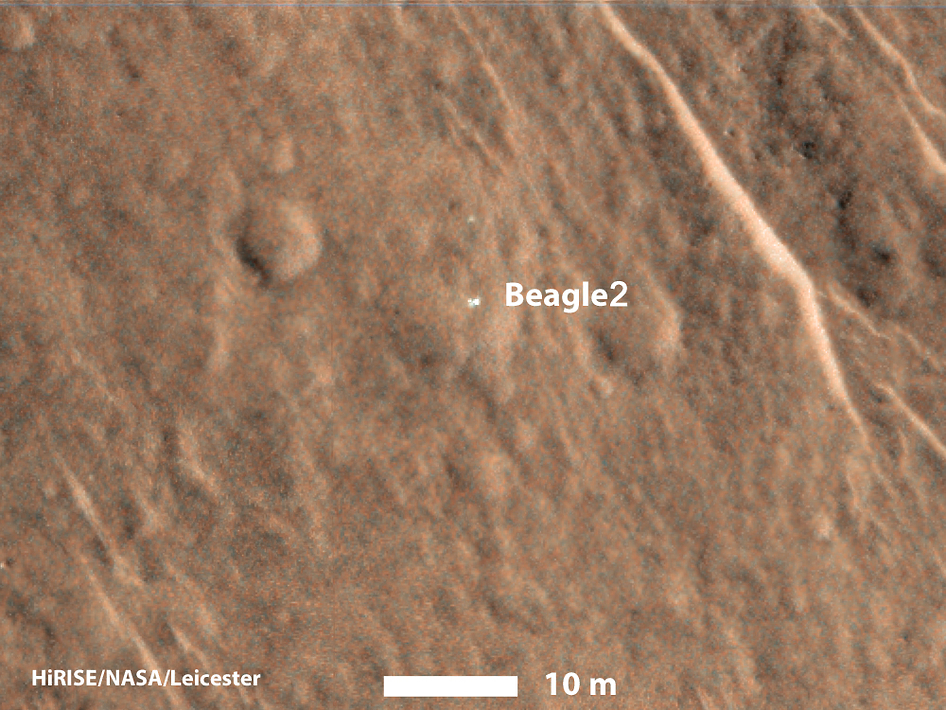
Context

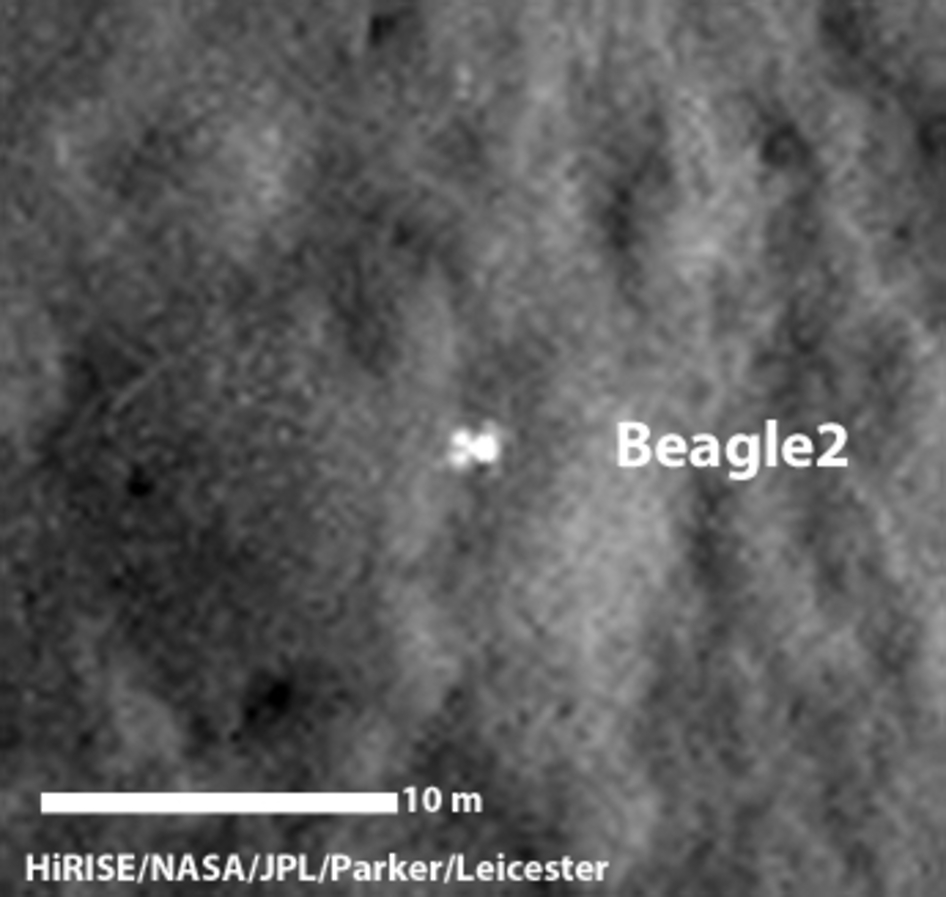
Close-up

Discovery images of Beagle 2, taken by the Mars Reconnaissance Orbiter in November and December 2014

== Mars 2020 mission ==
In 2018, the Jezero Crater in the north west rim of the Isidis basin was selected as a landing site for the Mars 2020 mission, including the Perseverance rover.

== See also ==
- Geography of Mars
- Geological history of Mars
- Hesperian
- List of plains on Mars
- Mars ocean theory
