= Jezero (crater) =

Crater on Mars

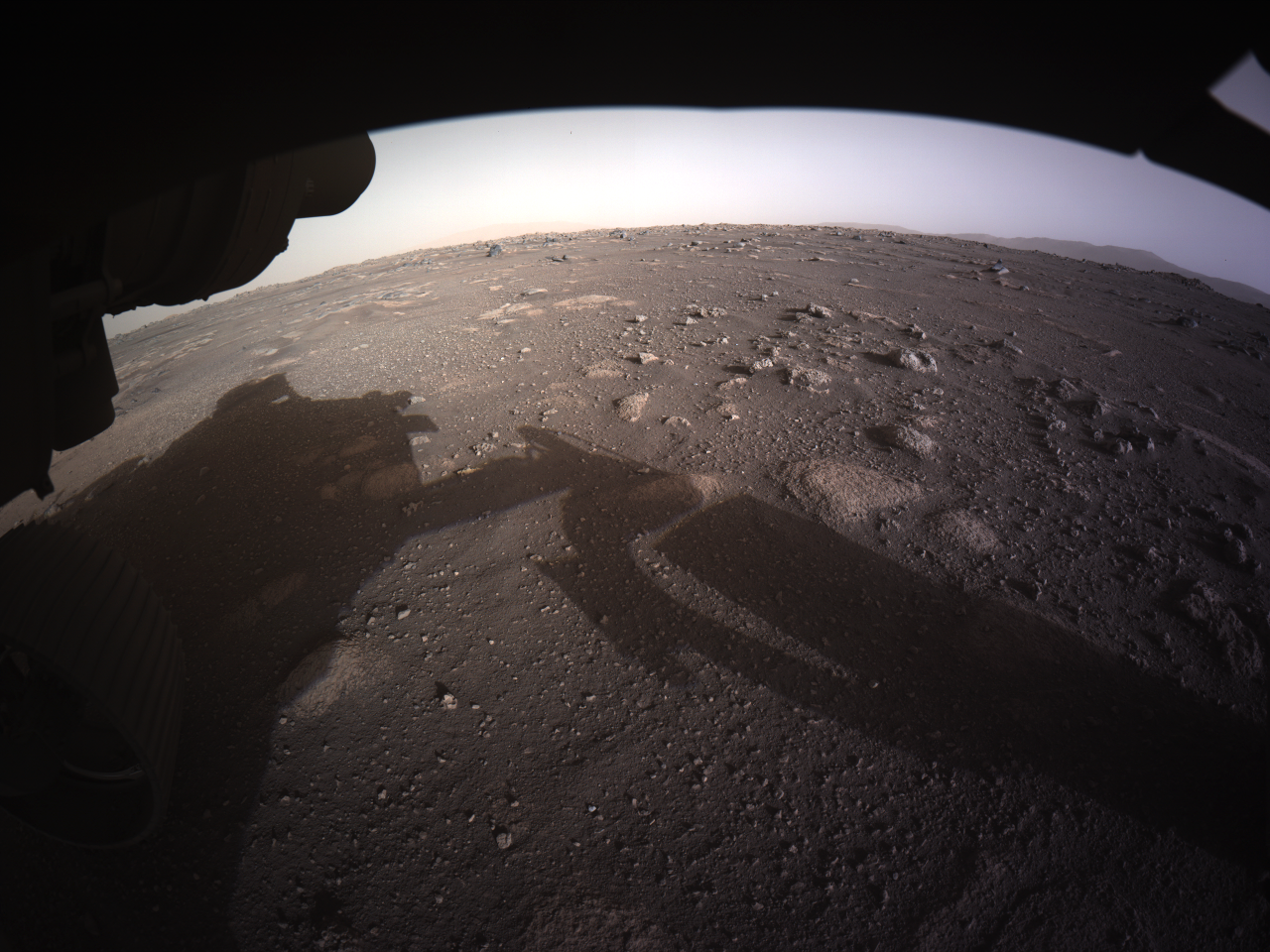
- First full-color image transmitted by Perseverance from Jezero
- Planet: Mars
- Coordinates: 18.38°N 77.58°E
- Quadrangle: Syrtis Major
- Diameter: 45 km (28 mi)
- Eponym: Jezero, Bosnia and Herzegovina

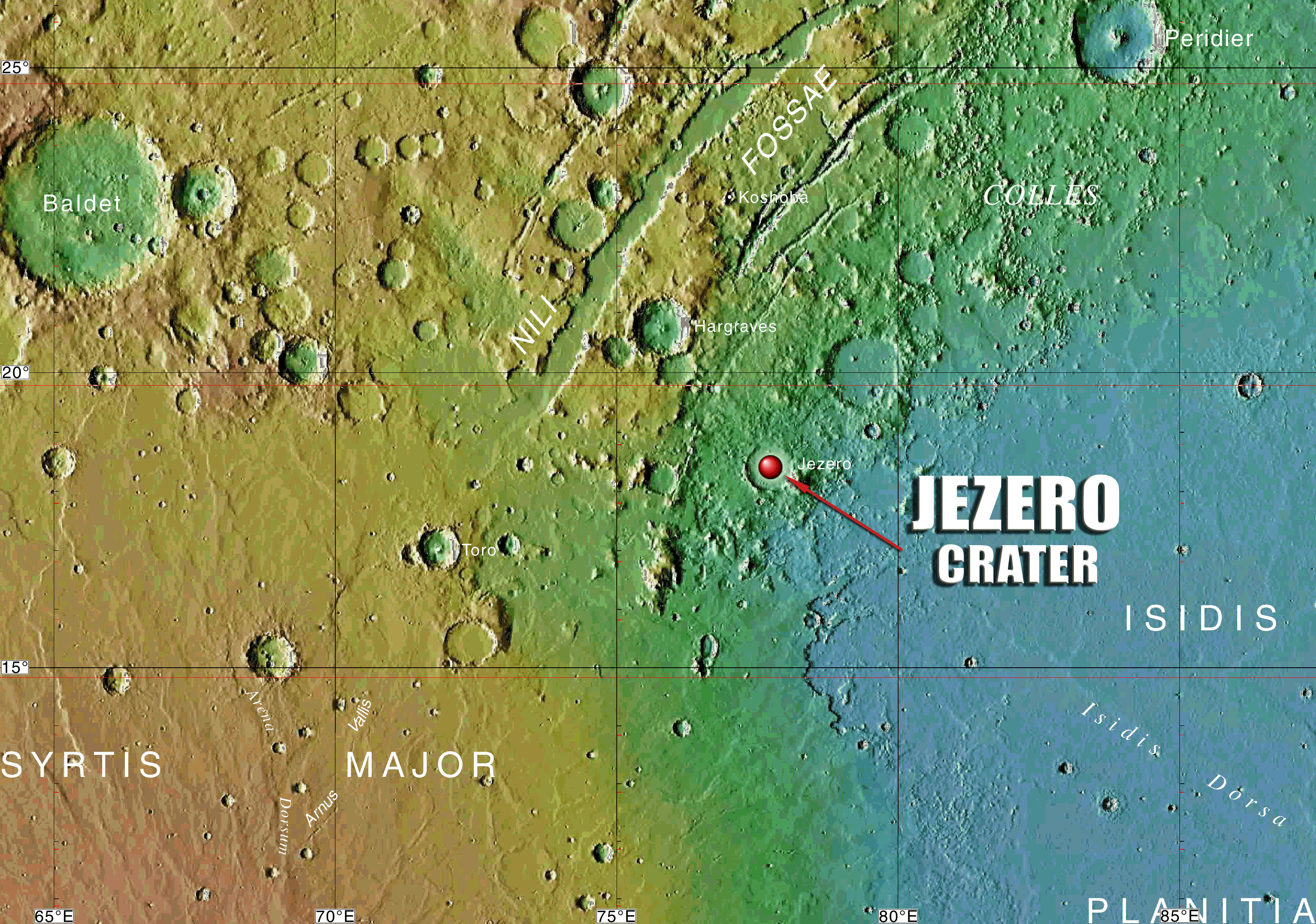
Jezero on the edge of the Isidis basin

Jezero (Note: The name is approximately pronounced /ˈjɛzəroʊ/ YEZ-ə-roh (Serbo-Croatian: [jêzero]), but the Mars 2020 mission team has commonly used the pronunciation /ˈdʒɛzəroʊ/ JEZ-ə-roh.) (ICAO: JZRO) is a crater on Mars in the Syrtis Major quadrangle, about 45.0 km (28.0 mi) in diameter. Thought to have once been flooded with water, the crater contains a fan-delta deposit rich in clays. The lake in the crater was present when valley networks were forming on Mars. Besides having a delta, the crater shows point bars and inverted channels. From a study of the delta and channels, it was concluded that the lake inside the crater probably formed during a period in which there was continual surface runoff.

In 2007, following the discovery of its ancient lake, the crater was named after Jezero, Bosnia and Herzegovina, one of several eponymous towns in the country. In some Slavic languages, the word jezero (Note: Bulgarian and Macedonian: езеро, romanized: ezero, Serbo-Croatian: jezero / језеро, Czech and Slovene: jezero, and its closest written variations (Polish: jezioro, Lower Sorbian: jezer, Slovak: jazero, Russian and Ukrainian: озеро, romanized: ozero), as well as in Baltic languages (Lithuanian: ežeras, Latvian: ezers)) means 'lake'.

In November 2018, it was announced that Jezero had been chosen as the landing site for the rover Perseverance as part of NASA's Mars 2020 mission. In November 2020, evidence of boulder falls was found on the slopes of the delta deposits that the rover is planned to explore, on the wall of Jezero itself as well as on the wall of Dacono, a small crater 2 km (1.2 mi) in diameter on the floor of Jezero. Perseverance successfully landed in the crater on 18 February 2021. On 5 March 2021, NASA named the landing site of the rover Octavia E. Butler Landing.

== Local features ==
- Séítah (pronounced /sei˥tʰa˩x/, meaning 'amidst the sand' in Navajo) – potentially the oldest accessible geologic units in Jezero Crater with multiple outcrops between the numerous sand ripples; location where Perseverance started the first year of its scientific campaign and took the first core samples.

In December 2021, NASA announced that some of the rocks in Jezero in Séítah were igneous. When examined closely, rocks revealed the mineral olivine surrounded by the mineral pyroxene. That arrangement happens in thick magma bodies and geologists call this type of texture "Cumulate." Carbonate and sulfate minerals were also detected which means that the rocks had been altered by water. The instrument used for this analysis was the Planetary Instrument for X-Ray Lithochemistry (PIXL).

== Crater ==
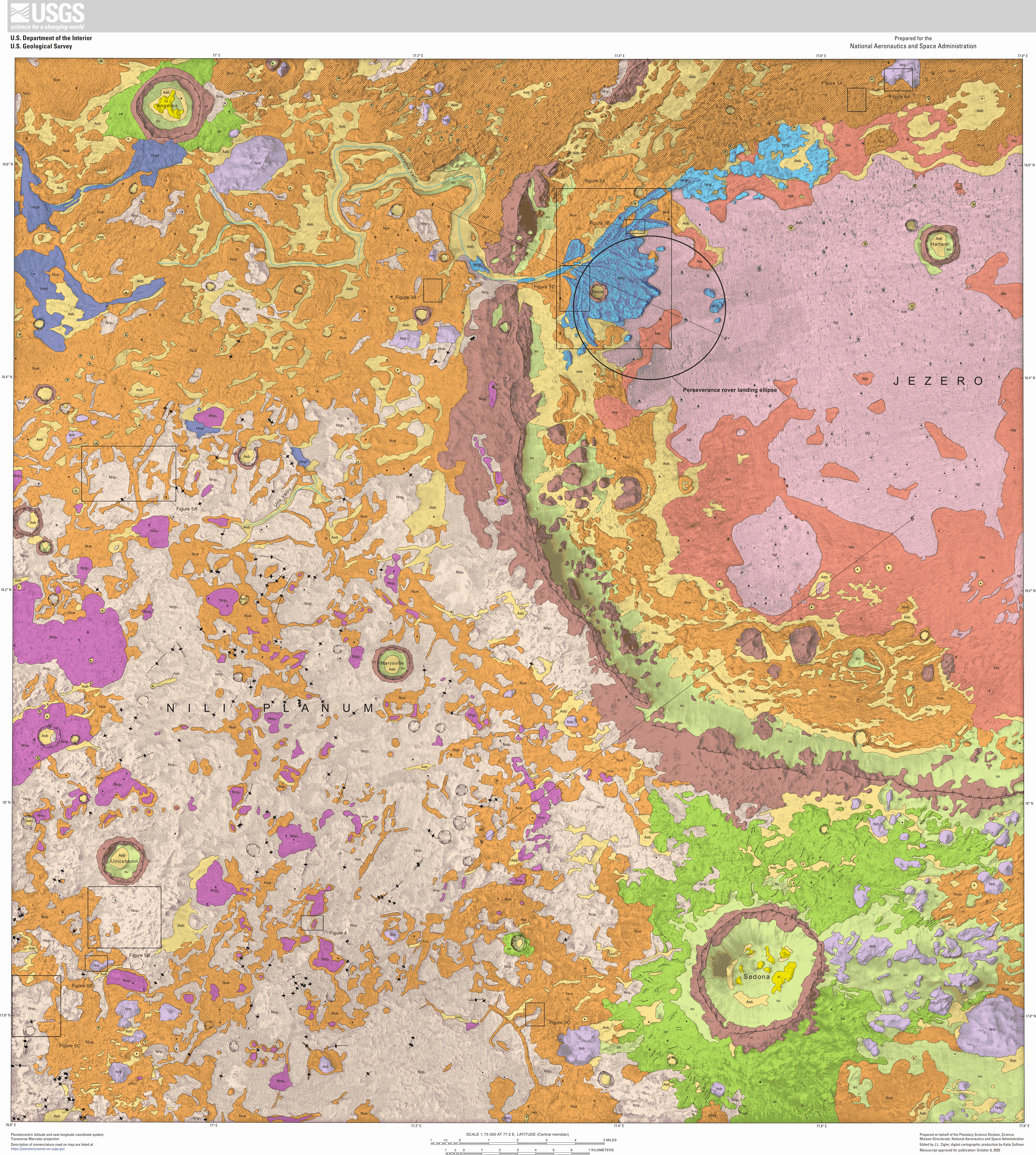
Geologic map of Jezero and the Nili Planum region

In a March 2015 paper, researchers from Brown University described how an ancient Martian lake system existed in Jezero. The study advanced the idea that water filled the crater at least two separate times. There are two channels on the northern and western sides of the crater that probably supplied it with water; each of these channels has a delta-like deposit where sediment was carried by water and deposited in the lake. Craters of a given diameter are expected to have a certain depth; a depth less than expected means sediment entered the crater. Calculations suggest that the crater may hold about 1 kilometre (0.62 mi) of sediments. Most of the sediments may have been brought in by channels.

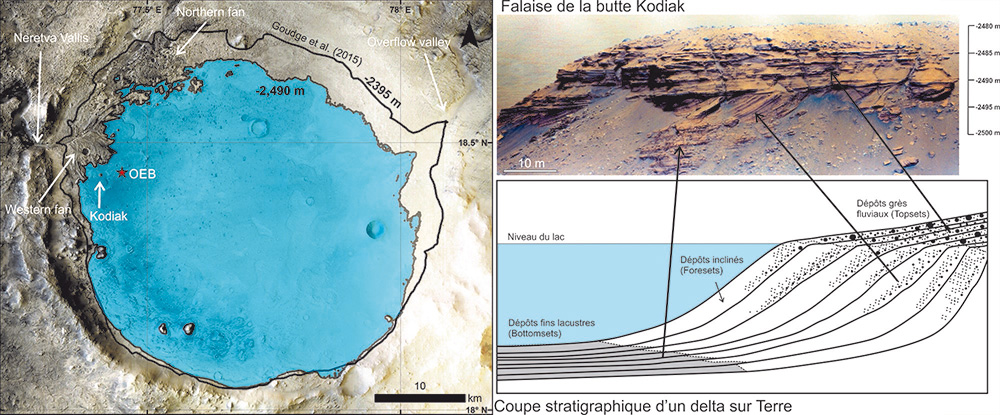
Estimations of the Jezero crater lake level as of 2021

Since it is believed that the lake was long-lived, life may have developed in the crater; the delta may have required a period of one to ten million years to form. Clay minerals have been detected in and around the crater. The Mars Reconnaissance Orbiter identified smectite clays. Clays form in the presence of water, so this area probably once held water and maybe life in ancient times. The surface in places is cracked into polygonal patterns; such shapes often form when clay dries out. The image below depicts examples of these patterns, and a channel that carried water and sediments into the crater.

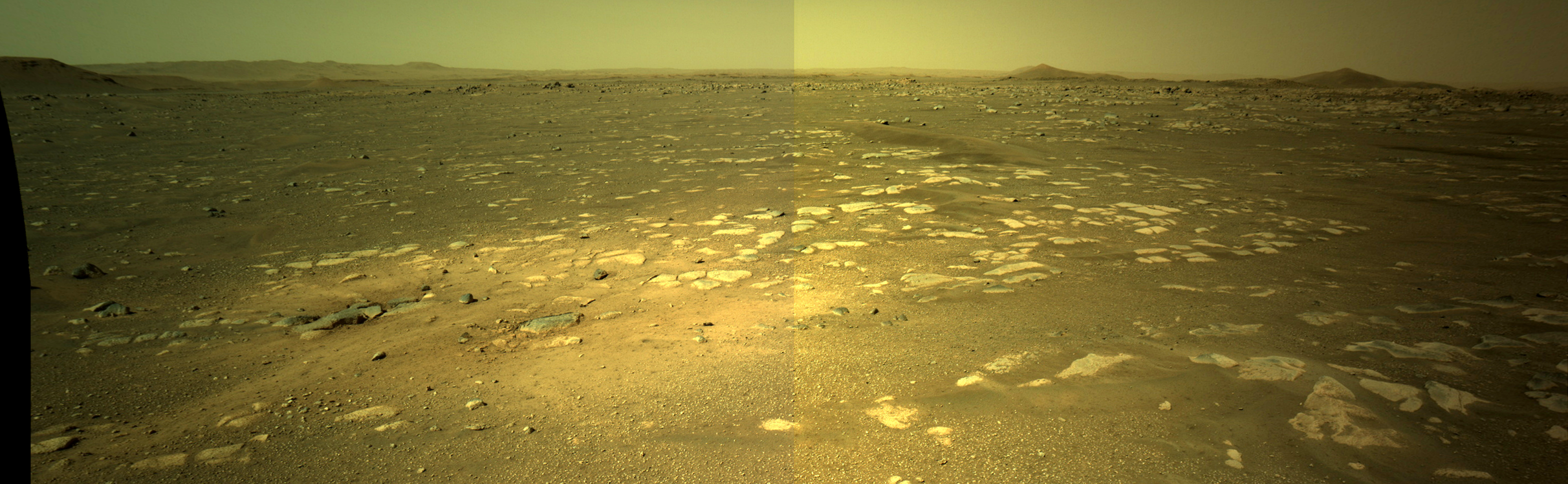
View of Jezero acquired by Perseverance's left navigation camera (Navcam) on the 14th sol of the mission

== Exploration ==
=== Mars 2020 mission ===
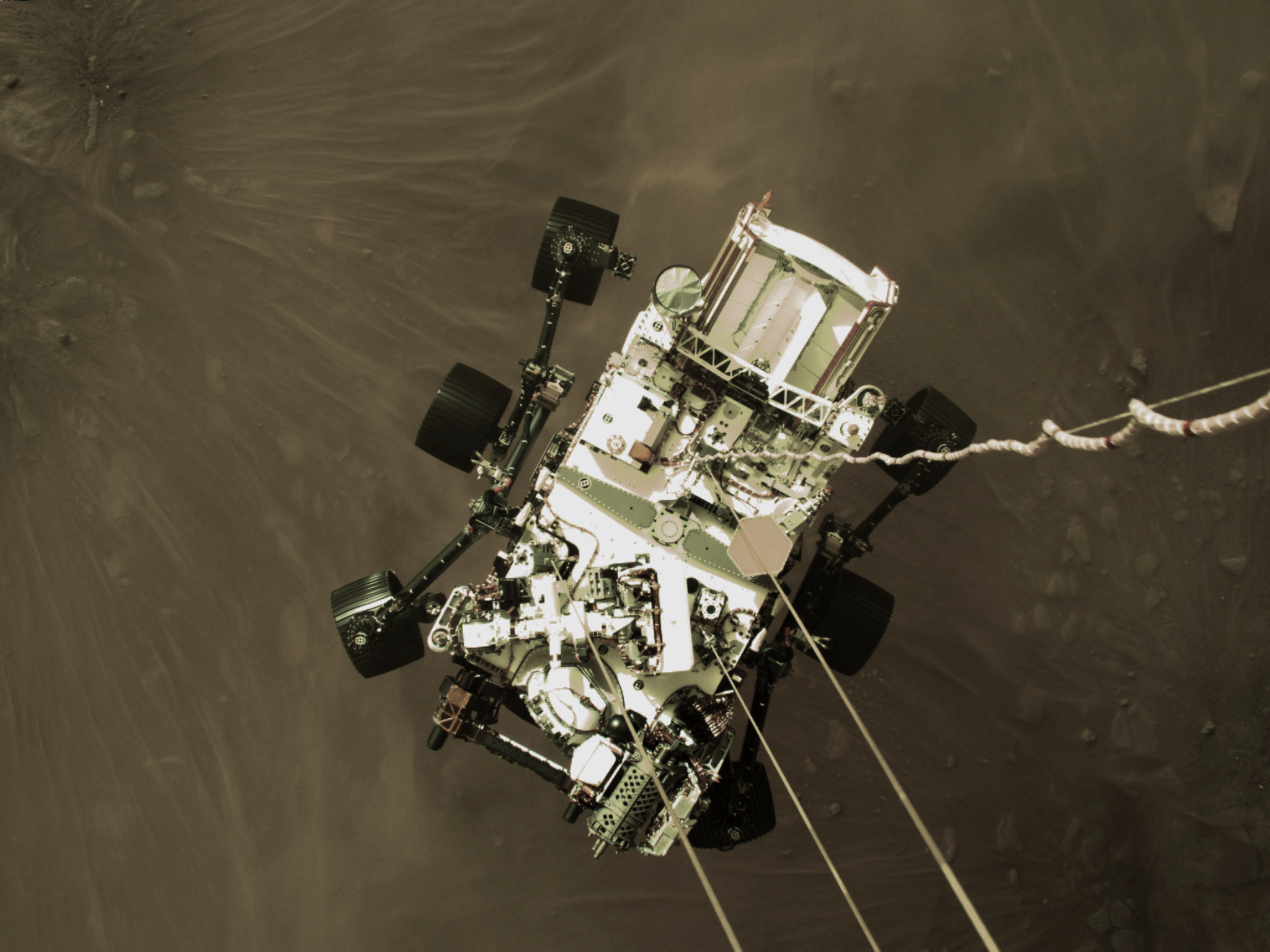
Perseverance landing in Jezero as seen from the sky crane deploying it

Jezero, once considered a site for the Mars Science Laboratory, was later proposed as a landing site for NASA's Mars 2020 mission, carrying the rover Perseverance and the helicopter Ingenuity. In early 2017 it was selected as one of the top three candidate landing sites, along with northeast Syrtis, 30 km (19 mi) to the southwest.

A primary aim of the Mars 2020 mission is to search for signs of ancient life. It is hoped that a later mission could then return Martian samples from sites identified as probably containing remains of life. To safely bring the craft down, a 12-mile (19 km) wide, smooth, flat circular area is needed. Geologists hope to examine places where water once ponded. They would like to examine sediment layers.

In November 2018, Jezero was selected as the target landing site for Mars 2020. On 18 February 2021, Perseverance landed successfully in the crater. On 19 April 2021, Ingenuity performed the first powered flight on Mars from Jezero, which received the commemorative ICAO airport code JZRO.

=== Mars Sample Retrieval Lander ===
An ESA–NASA team produced a three-launch architecture concept for a Mars sample return, which uses the Mars 2020 rover to cache small samples, a two-stage, solid-fueled Mars ascent stage to send it into orbit, and an orbiter to rendezvous with it above Mars and take it to Earth. Solar electric propulsion could allow a one launch sample return instead of three. So, after a launch in July 2026, a lander with a Mars ascent rocket (developed by NASA) with two sample recovery helicopters lands exactly near the Mars 2020 rover at Three Forks in Jezero Crater in August 2028. The collected samples by Mars 2020 are delivers them to the ascent rocket. Once loaded with the samples, the Mars ascent rocket will launch with the sample return canister in spring 2029 and reach a low Mars orbit.

This design would ease the schedule of the whole project, giving controllers time and flexibility to carry out the required operations. Furthermore, the program could rely on the successful landing system developed for the Mars Science Laboratory, avoiding the costs and risks associated with developing and testing yet another landing system from scratch. In addition, NASA may change the solar panels on lander with Radioisotope Thermoelectric Generator, a nuclear power source, to ensure sufficient power and to keep the rocket's propulsion system from getting too cold, thus ensuring a longer lifetime, better thermal protection and safe operation even if they are carried in Mars Global Dust Storm Season, but these changes are still to be clarified by NASA.

== Discoveries ==
In 2022, the Perseverance Rover detected organic molecules in the crater.

Although it was believed that Jezero was a lake, Perseverance found igneous rocks. The rocks were once molten and then slowly cooled. They contained the mineral olivine surrounded by the mineral pyroxene which happens in thick magma bodies. Such a texture is called "Cumulate." The rocks had also been changed by water since carbonate and sulfate minerals were also found. The rocks studied were in location nicknamed "South Séítah" ("Séítah" means "amidst the sand" in the Navajo language). The Planetary Instrument for X-ray Lithochemistry (PIXL) was used for this analysis.

Perseverance detected many dust devils. On a typical Martian day at least four dust devils pass Perseverance. At a peak hour long period just after noon, more than one per hour passes. Perseverance made these observations mostly with its cameras and a group of sensors in the Mars Environmental Dynamics Analyzer (MEDA). MEDA includes wind sensors and light sensors.

A possible detection of evidence of past life was announced in July 2024. Cheyava Falls, described as "an arrowhead-shaped rock," contains organic chemicals. And nearby are rings in the rocks that could have been produced by past life. On 10 September 2025, NASA reported that the rock contained possible biosignatures. Speckles in rocks contained the minerals vivianite, an iron phosphate, and greigite, an iron sulfide. On Earth, vivianite frequently forms in lakes and coastal sediments where microbes use iron in their metabolism. Microbes use iron (III) oxide, and release ferrous iron (II) as a waste. That ferrous iron reacts with phosphate to form vivianite.

Microbes derive energy to live by reactions that change the oxidation number of compounds. The terms involved can be confusing. We speak of compounds as being reduced when they gain electrons. The word "reduction" refers to the reduction in the oxidation number. Electrons bear a negative charge, thus when something gains an extra negative charge from the electron its number of positives goes down--that is its oxidation number goes down. A detailed description of this process can be found at redox.

Greigite tends to form when microbes break down sulfate. They change sulfate to sulfide which unites with iron to produce greigite. When found together on Earth, these minerals and organic molecules are usually considered a sort of biosignature. There are possible conditions by which these minerals may have been formed, other than by microbes or biological reactions. These include constant high temperatures, acidic conditions, and binding by organic compounds. However, current evidence suggests it is improbable these conditions were present. The rock formations where these observations were made, called Bright Angel, do not show evidence that they experienced high temperatures or acidic conditions. It is also unknown whether the organic compounds present would have been capable of catalyzing the reaction at the low temperatures at which it appears the reaction occurred. This chemical evidence implying the existence of past life appeared in some of the youngest sedimentary rocks the Perseverance mission has examined. For a long time, it was assumed signs of ancient life would be only found in older rock formations. This discovery may mean that Mars could have been habitable for a longer period, or until later in the planet's history, than previously thought. Older rocks also might hold signs of life that are simply harder to detect.

A paper published December 2025 in Science by over 70 authors details what Perseverance discovered in the "Margin Unit," a geologic area at the margin, or inner edge, of Jezero Crater. With the information collected, the scientists were able to come up with an understanding of the history of the crater. Other craters on Mars may have undergone some of the same processes. After a large impact created Jezero Crater hot magma moved and accumulated under the ground forming what are called intrusions. In these chambers of magma there was very slow cooling over a long period of time. Scientists concluded that because the rocks examined contained large crystals. Such crystals are produced by very slow cooling. Later erosion exposed these old chambers. Lava, then came into Jezero. The basalt that was formed was detected by Perseverance. It also found carbonate minerals. These minerals meant that water came in and formed a lake. Just looking at satellite pictures of Jezero, one might guess that only minerals derived from sedimentary rocks would be found on the surface. However, several classes of rocks were formed that indicated a complex history.

A large team of scientists published a paper about thousands of bleached rocks that are loaded with a mineral difficult to form without long-term exposure to water. This is new evidence that Mars was warmer, wetter and possibly rain-soaked billions of years ago. The bleached rocks are loaded with kaolinite, a soft, white, clay mineral that, on Earth, usually forms when water slowly dissolves and carries other elements from rock over thousands to millions of years. On Earth, it is most commonly found in warm, humid environments. Several thousand of these kaolinite-rich rocks ranging from small pebbles to large boulders scattered across the surface of Jezero Crater were discovered by Perseverance. They ranged in size from small pebbles to large boulders. They are aluminum-rich (30-45 wt% Al2O3) and are depleted of iron and magnesium.

Jones and others published a paper about old rocks on the rim of Jezero Crater. Some were as old as 3.9 billion years. Some rocks look like they were made by explosive volcanic eruptions or meteorite impacts. There were also glassy beads called “spherules,” which have shapes and distributions most consistent with solidified droplets of molten rock produced by impacts into the Martian surface. These sperules suggest formation by impact instead of volcanism. And several impacts may have been involved including the Isidis impact. The team mainly focused on a ∼75-m-thick group of layered, clastic bedrock named the Broom Point member of the Witch Hazel Hill formation.

== See also ==
- Astrobiology – Science concerned with life in the universe
- Climate of Mars
- Composition of Mars – Branch of the geology of Mars
- Exploration of Mars
- Geology of Mars – Geology of fourth planet from the Sun
- Impact crater – Circular depression in a solid astronomical body formed by the impact of a smaller object
- Inverted relief – Landscape features that have reversed their elevation relative to other features
- Lakes on Mars – Former bodies of water on Mars
- List of craters on Mars
- Mars landing – Landing of a spacecraft on the surface of Mars
- Perseverance (rover)
- Syrtis Major quadrangle
- Redox
- Water on Mars – Study of past and present water on Mars
