= Syrtis Major Planum =

Martian shield volcano

Syrtis Major
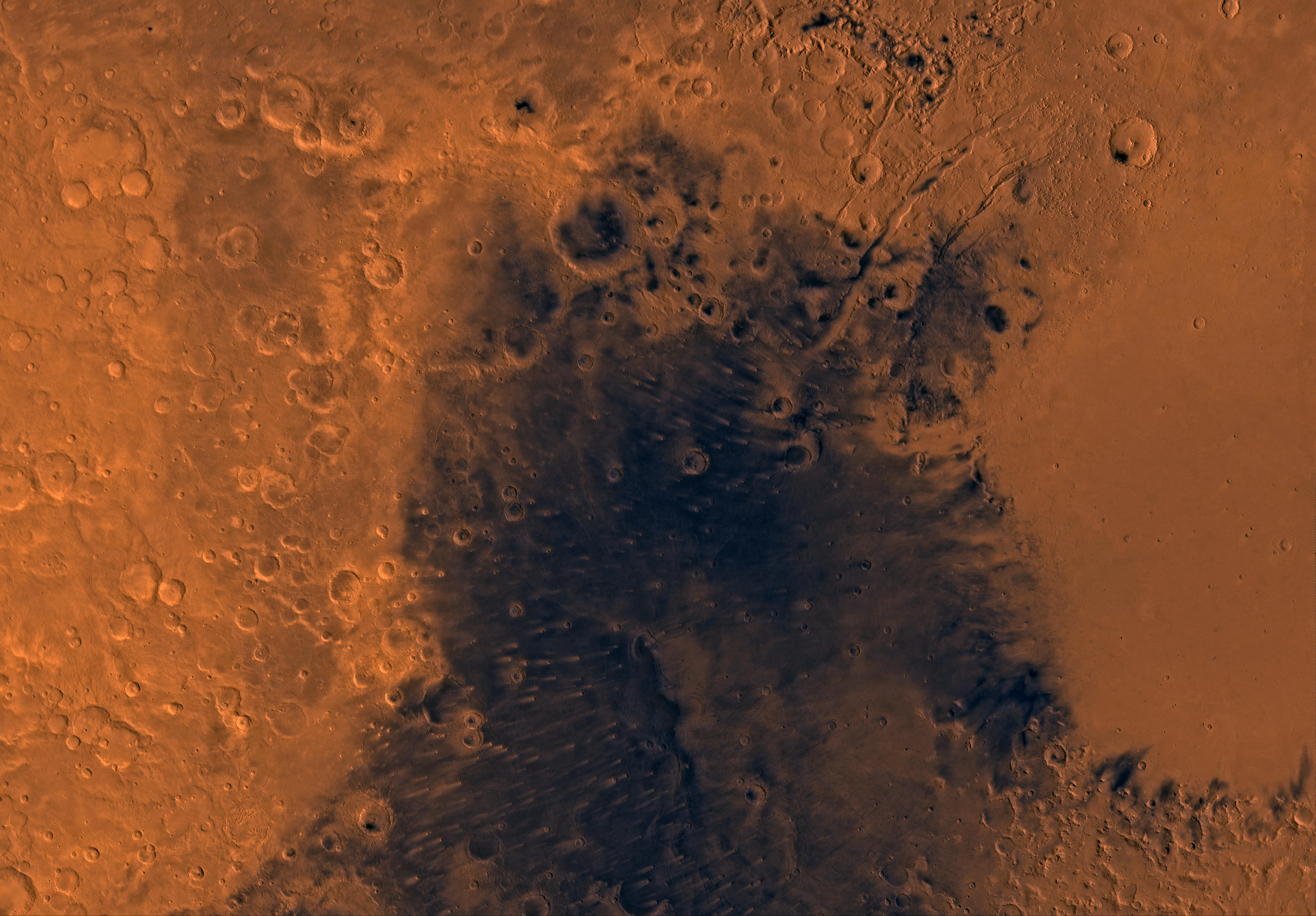
- Mars digital-image mosaic merged with color of the MC-13 quadrangle, Syrtis Major region of Mars.
- Feature type: Shield volcano
- Coordinates: 8.4°N 69.5°E
- Diameter: ~1 300 km
- Peak: ~2.3 km
- Discoverer: Christiaan Huygens
- Eponym: Gulf of Sidra

Syrtis Major Planum (formerly Syrtis Major Planitia) is a massive shield volcano in the eastern hemisphere of Mars. A "dark spot" (an albedo feature), Syrtis Major Planum is located in the boundary between the northern lowlands and southern highlands of Mars just west of the impact basin Isidis in the Syrtis Major quadrangle. It was formerly believed to be a plain, and was therefore described as a planitia. Later data from the Mars Global Surveyor revealed that it is actually a broad topographic rise. The dark color of Syrtis Major Planum comes from the basaltic volcanic rock of the region and the relative lack of dust.

The selected landing site for the Mars 2020 mission that includes the rover Perseverance and the helicopter drone Ingenuity was Jezero crater, at 18.855°N 77.519°E within the region. The northeastern region of Syrtis Major Planum was also considered a potential landing site.

== Geography and geology ==
Syrtis Major is centered near at 8.4°N 69.5°E. It extends some 1,500 km (930 mi) north from the planet's equator, and spans 1,000 km (620 mi) from west to east. It is in the Syrtis Major quadrangle. It encompasses a large slope from its western edge at Aeria, dropping 4 km (2.5 mi) to its eastern edge at Isidis Planitia. Most of Syrtis Major has slopes of less than 1°, a much lower inclination than the slopes of the Tharsis shield volcanoes. It has a 350 km × 150 km north–south elongated central depression containing the calderas Nili Patera and Meroe Patera, which are about 2 km deep.

The roughly 2,300-meter high peak of Syrtis Major is located northwest of Nili Patera. The floors of the calderas are unique among large Martian volcanoes as they are not elevated relative to the terrain surrounding Syrtis Major. This may account for the high degree of magmatic evolution and hydrothermal activity seen in Nili Patera. The floor of Nili Patera is the less cratered, and therefore the younger, of the two. While most of the rock is basaltic, dacite has also been detected in Nili Patera.

Satellite gravity field measurements show a positive gravity anomaly centered on the caldera complex, suggesting the presence of a 600 km × 300 km north–south elongated extinct magma chamber below, containing dense minerals (probably mainly pyroxene, with olivine also possible) that precipitated out of magma before eruptions. Crater counts date Syrtis Major to the early Hesperian epoch; it postdates formation of the adjacent Isidis impact basin.

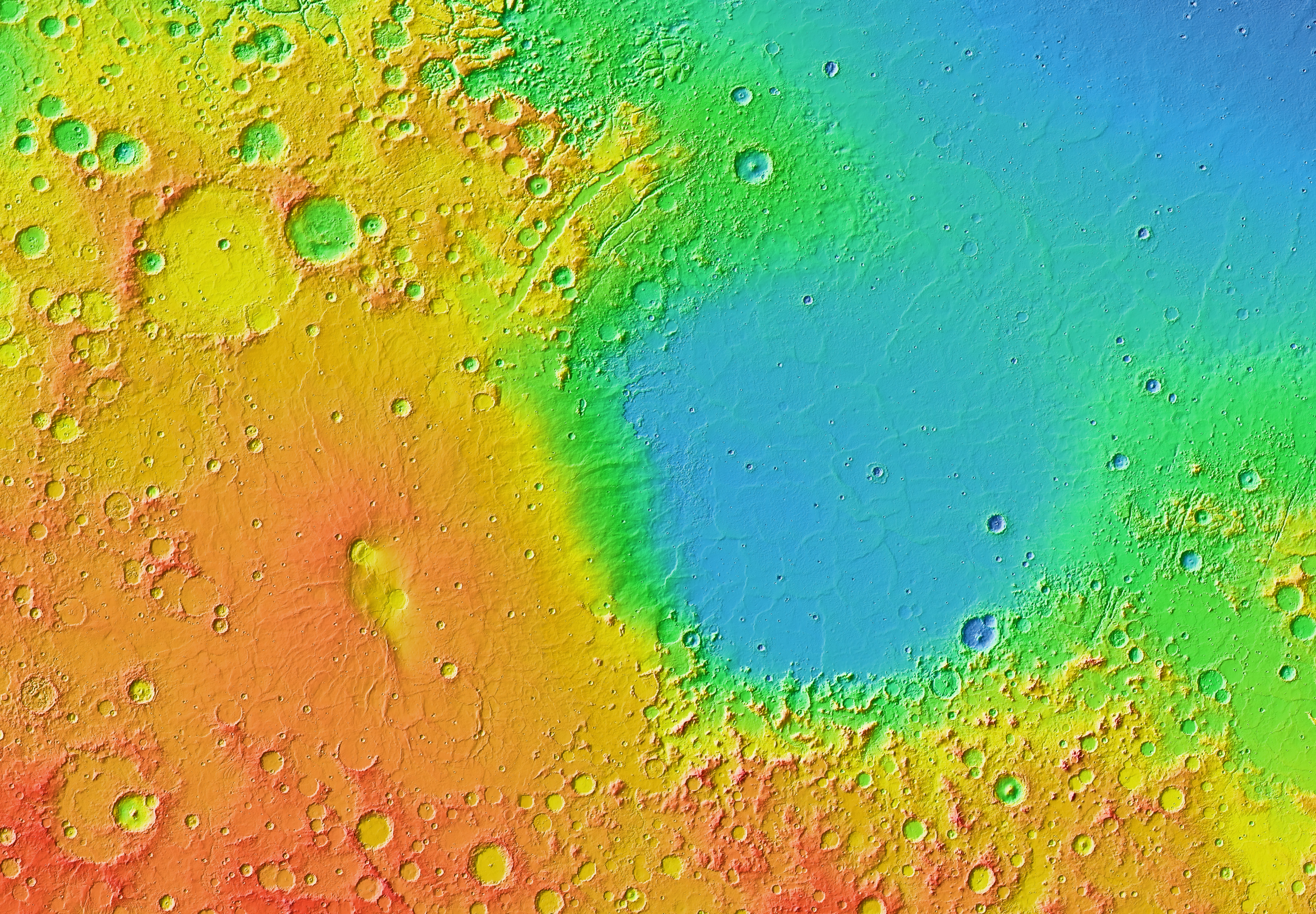
A MOLA colorized topographic map showing the impact basin Isidis Planitia (right) and Syrtis Major Planum (left).

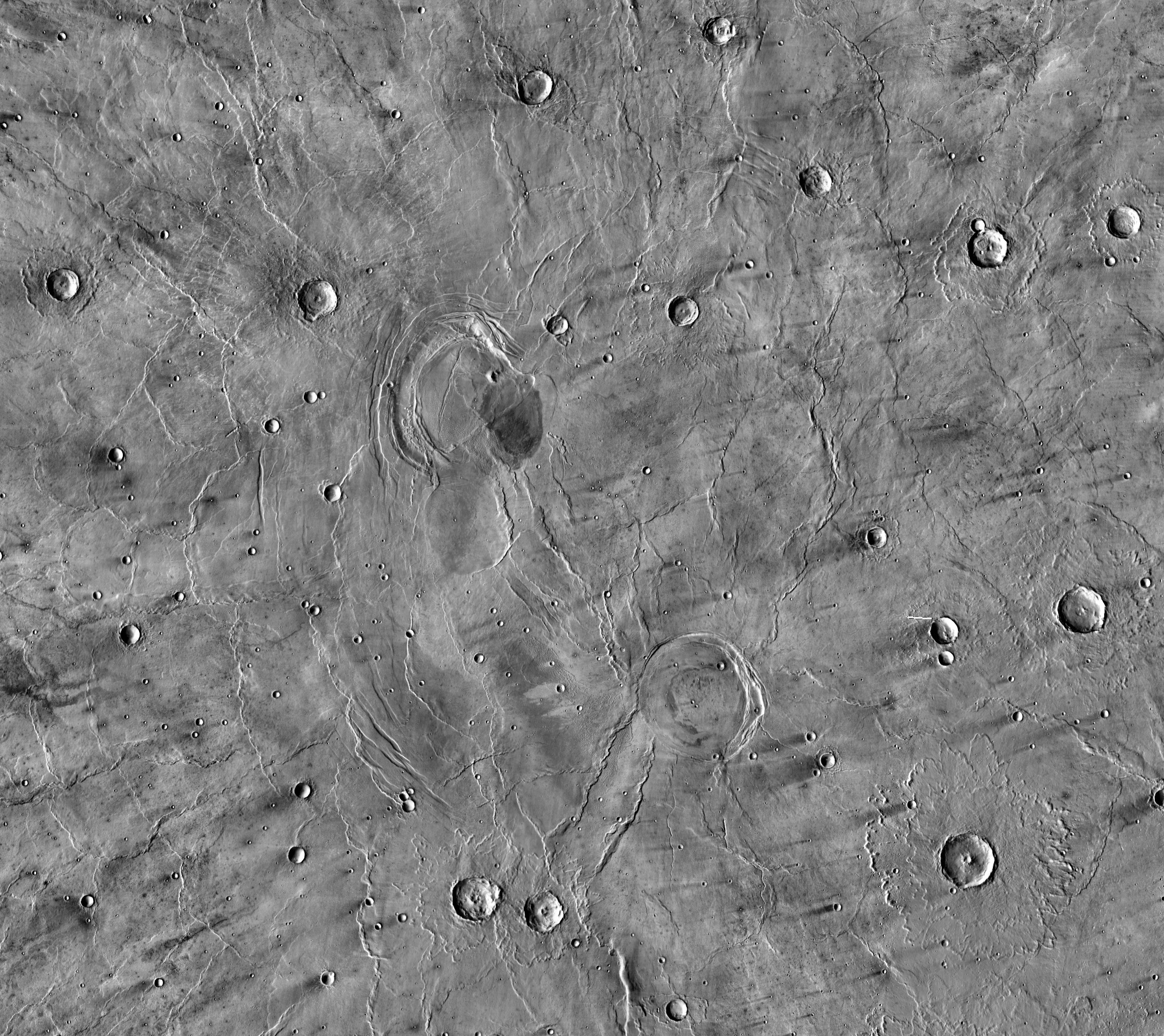
A THEMIS daytime infrared image mosaic of the central area of Syrtis Major. Calderas Nili Patera and Meroe Patera are to the upper left and lower right of center, respectively.

== Discovery and name ==
The name Syrtis Major is derived from the classical Roman name Syrtis maior for the Gulf of Sidra on the coast of Libya (classical Cyrenaica).

Syrtis Major was the first documented surface feature of another planet. It was discovered by Christiaan Huygens, who included it in a drawing of Mars in 1659. He used repeated observations of the feature to estimate the length of day on Mars. The feature was originally known as the Hourglass Sea but has been given different names by different cartographers. In 1850s, Angelo Secchi called the feature Atlantic Canale. Later he called it Scorpion and Cook Sea or Cook Canal.

In Richard Proctor's 1867 map it is called the Kaiser Sea, after Frederik Kaiser of the Leiden Observatory. In 1876, Camille Flammarion called it the Mer du Sablier (French for "Hourglass Sea") when he revised Proctor's nomenclature. The name "Syrtis Major" was chosen by Giovanni Schiaparelli when he created a map based on observations made during Mars' close approach to Earth in 1877.

== Seasonal variations ==
Syrtis Major was the object of much observation due to its seasonal and long-term variations. This led to theories that it was a shallow sea and later that its variability was due to seasonal vegetation. In the 1960s and 1970s, the Mariner and Viking planetary probes led scientists to conclude that the variations were caused by wind blowing dust and sand across the area. It has many windblown deposits that include light-colored halos or plumose streaks that form downwind of craters. These streaks are accumulations of dust resulting from disruption of the wind by the elevated rims of the craters ('wind shadows').

== Nili Patera Caldera ==
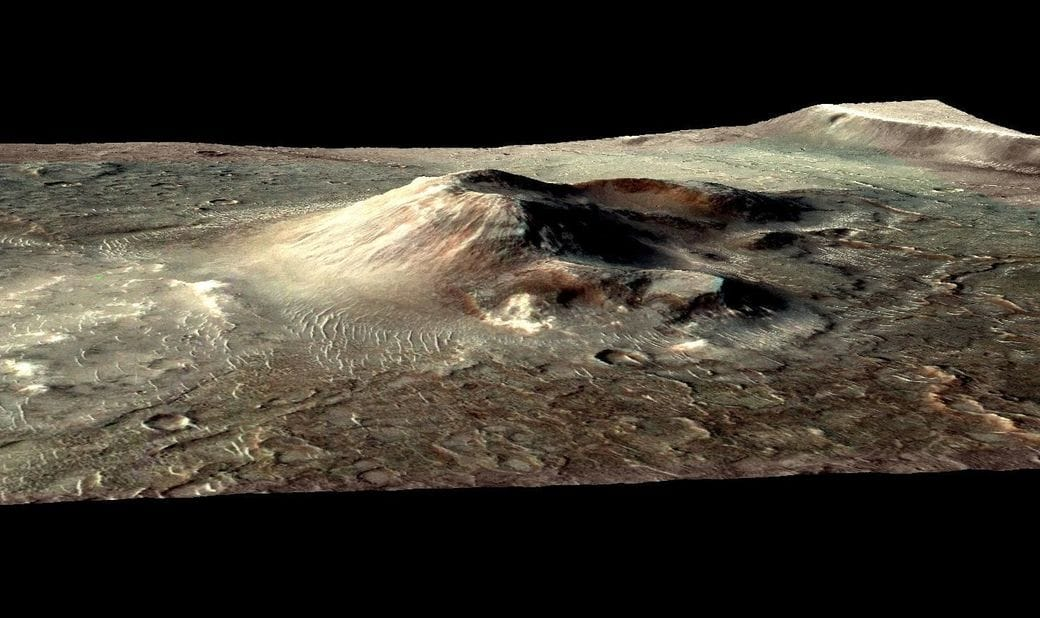
The Nili Tholus cinder cone in the Nili Patera caldera on Mars.

Nili Patera is a 50 km diameter caldera at the center of the Syrtis Major Volcanic Complex. It and Meroe Patera located to the south are the primary named calderas within a nested caldera complex developed by multiple eruption and collapse events. In the Northeast quadrant of Nili Patera is a 630 m tall volcanic cone named Nili Tholus, on and around this cone is a light-tone lava flow of chemically evolved lava with multiple occurrences of relict silica sinter deposits created by a formerly active hot spring system.

== Moving sand dunes and ripples ==
Back-and-forth blinking of this two-image animation shows movement of an advancing sand dune in Nili Patera, Mars

Nili Patera was the subject of a 2010 study into moving sand dunes and wind ripples. The study showed that dunes are active and that sand ripples are actively migrating on the surface of Mars. A following study also showed that the sand dunes move at about the same flux (volume per time) as dunes in Antarctica. This was unexpected because of the thin air and the winds which are weaker than Earth winds. It may be due to "saltation" - ballistic movement of sand grains which travel further in the weaker Mars gravity.

The lee fronts of the dunes in this region move on average 0.5 meters per year. The selection may be biased here as they only measured dunes with clear lee edges to measure. The ripples move on average 0.1 meters per year.

== Gallery ==
Mosaic of Syrtis Major was taken by Viking 1 orbiter

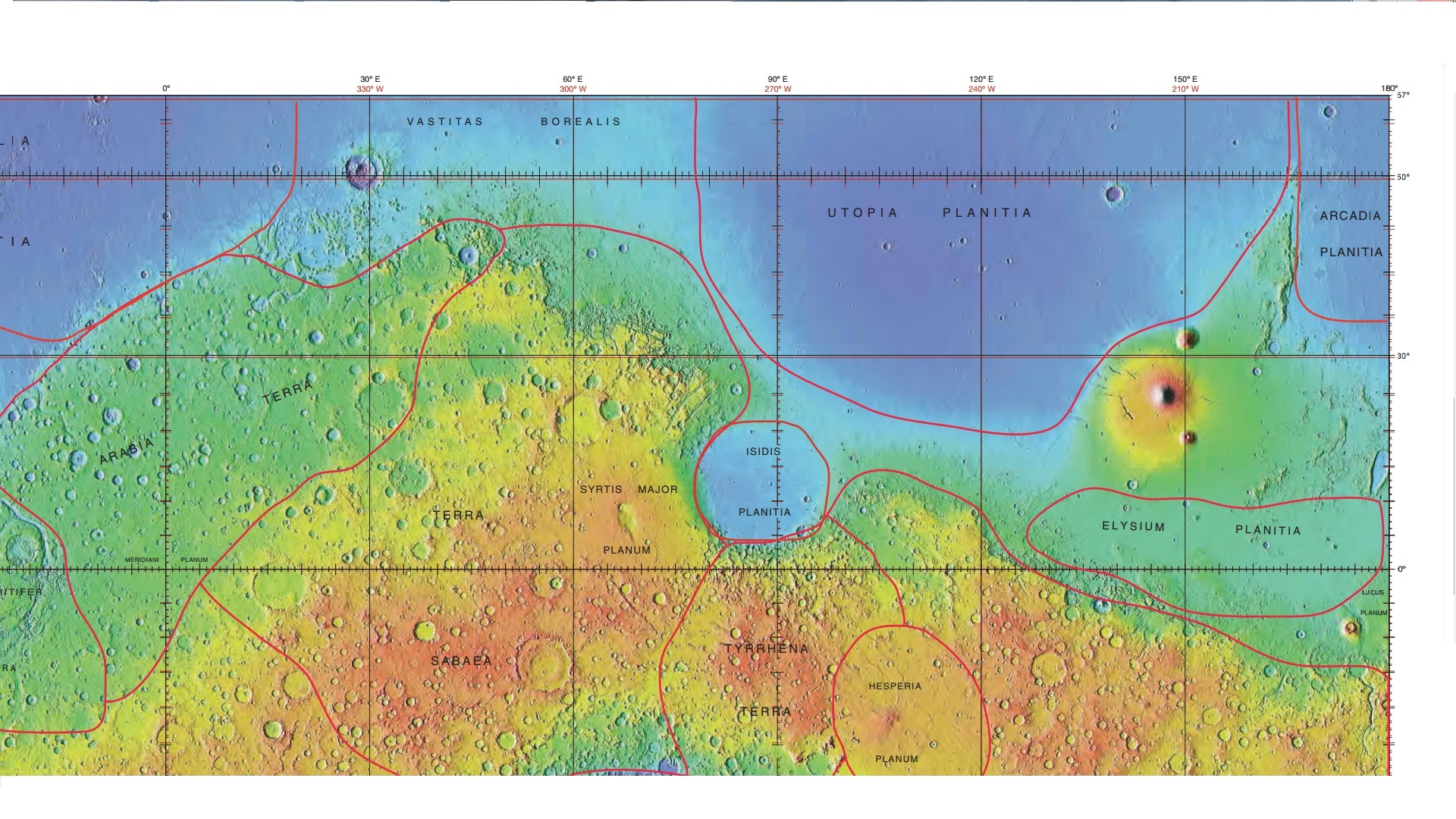
A MOLA map showing boundaries of Syrtis Major Planum and other regions. Colors indicate elevations.

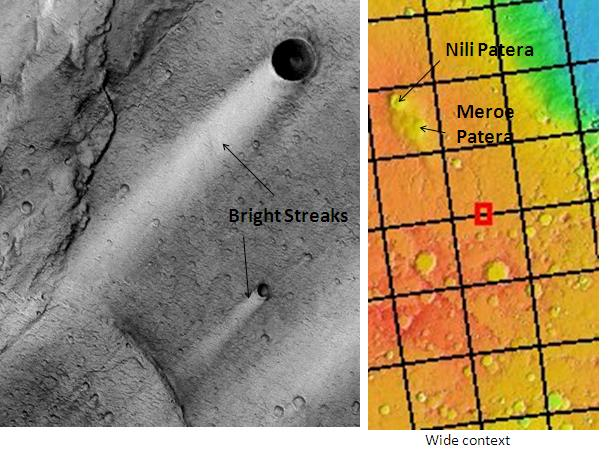
Bright Streaks in Syrtis Major caused by the wind, as seen by THEMIS.
Selected Mars 2020 mission landing site - Jezero crater (18.855°N 77.519°E)
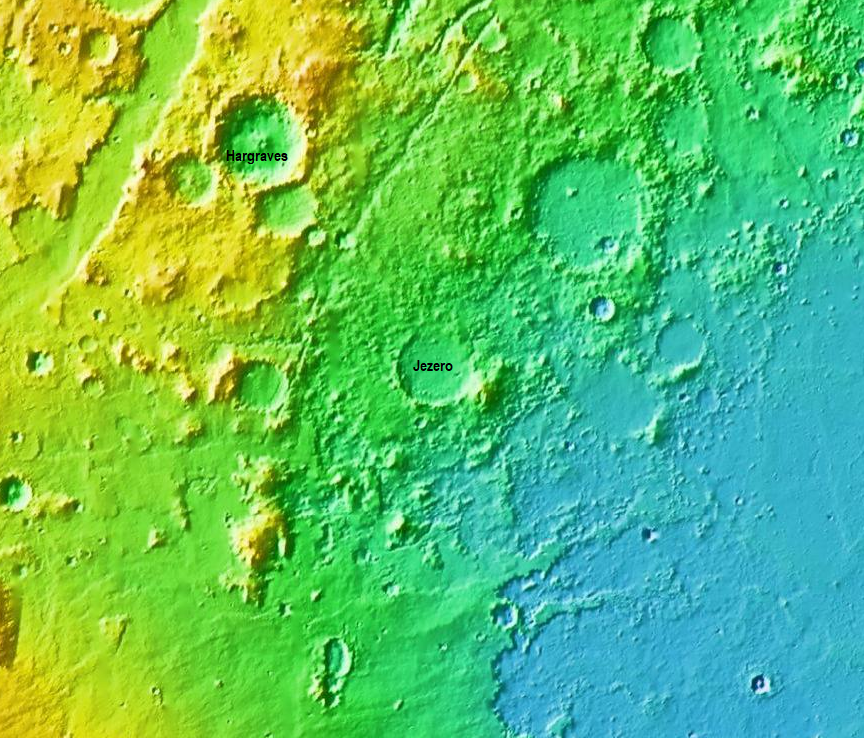
Jezero crater and region

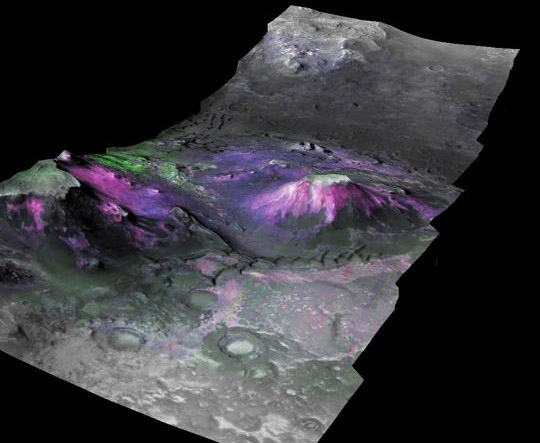
Water-rich terrain

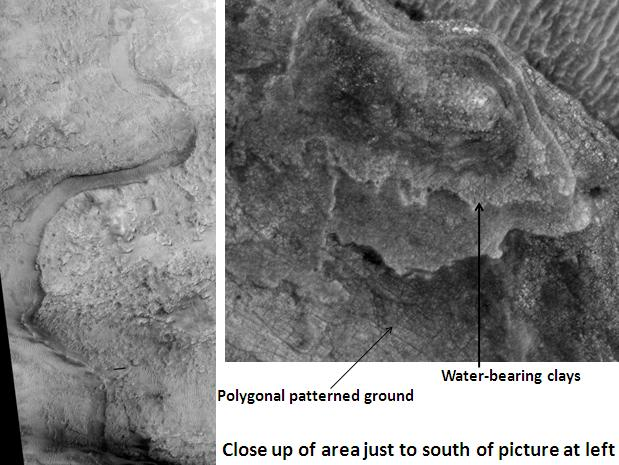
Possible channel bringing sediment to the crater

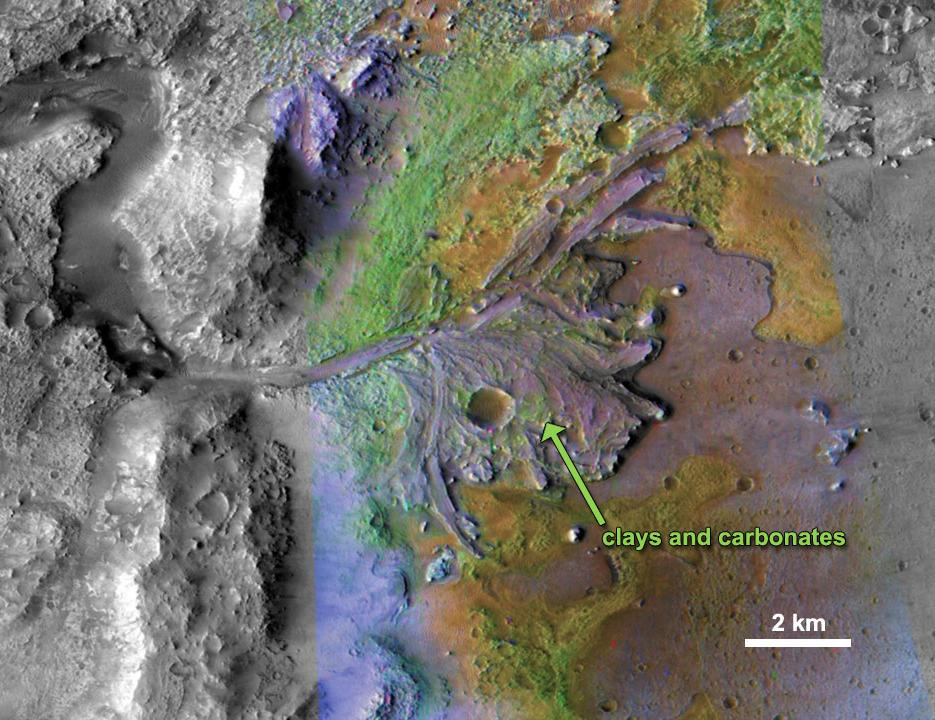
Jezero crater delta - chemical alteration by water (hi-res)

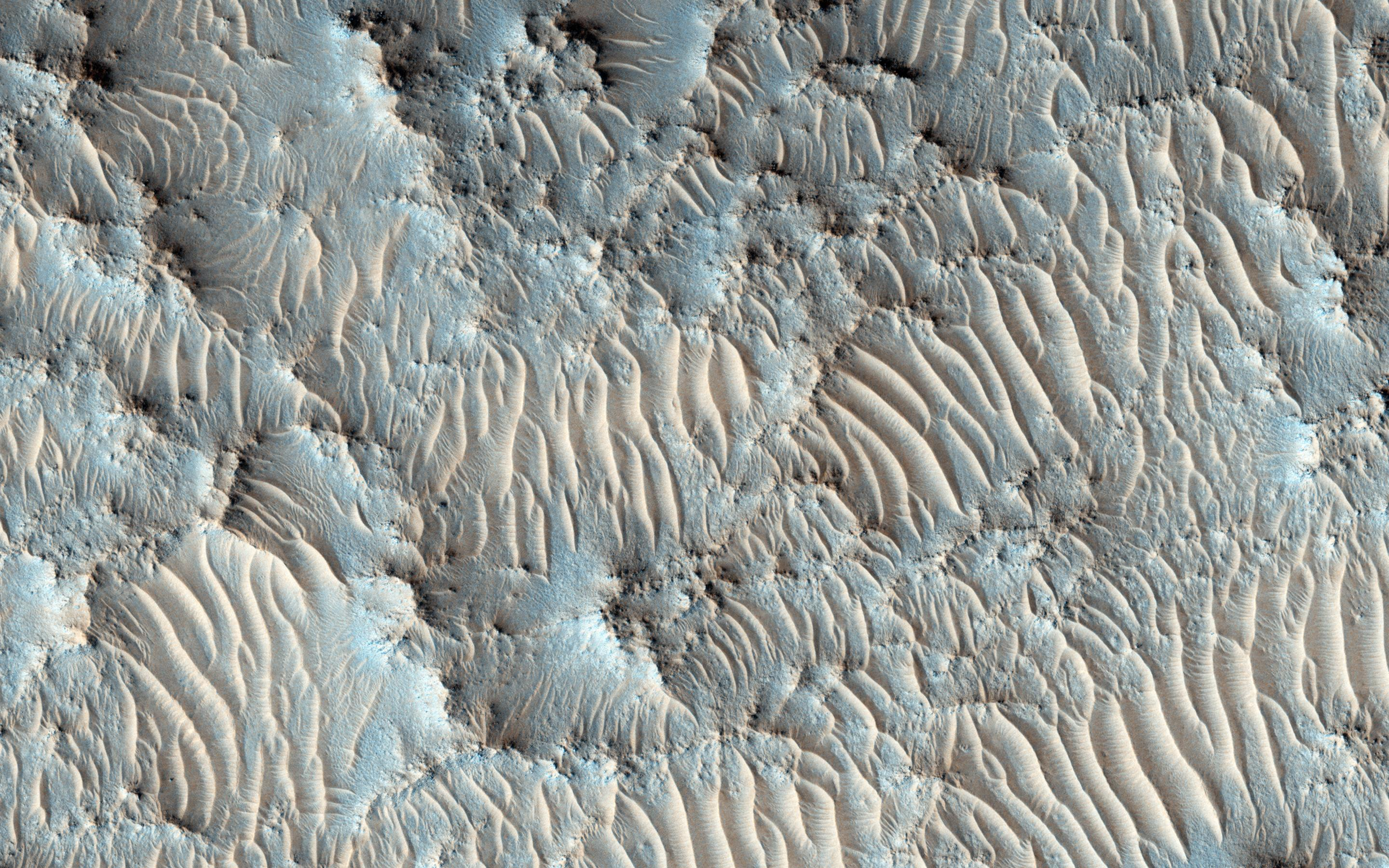
Detected clay materials suggest an ancient lake

== See also ==
- List of mountains on Mars by height
