= Syrtis Major quadrangle =

One of a series of 30 quadrangle maps of Mars

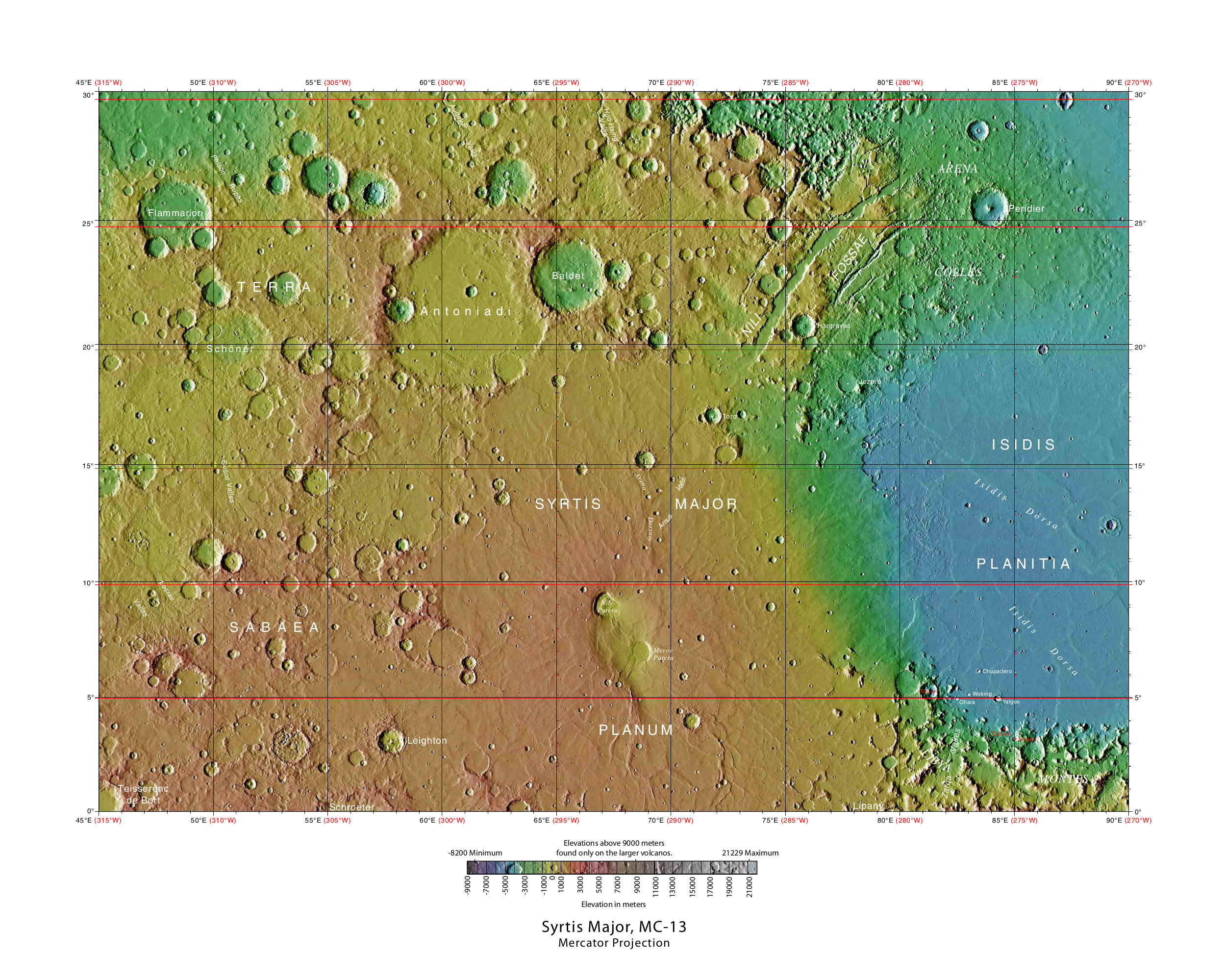
- Map of Syrtis Major quadrangle from Mars Orbiter Laser Altimeter (MOLA) data. The highest elevations are red and the lowest are blue.
- Coordinates: 15°N 292.5°W

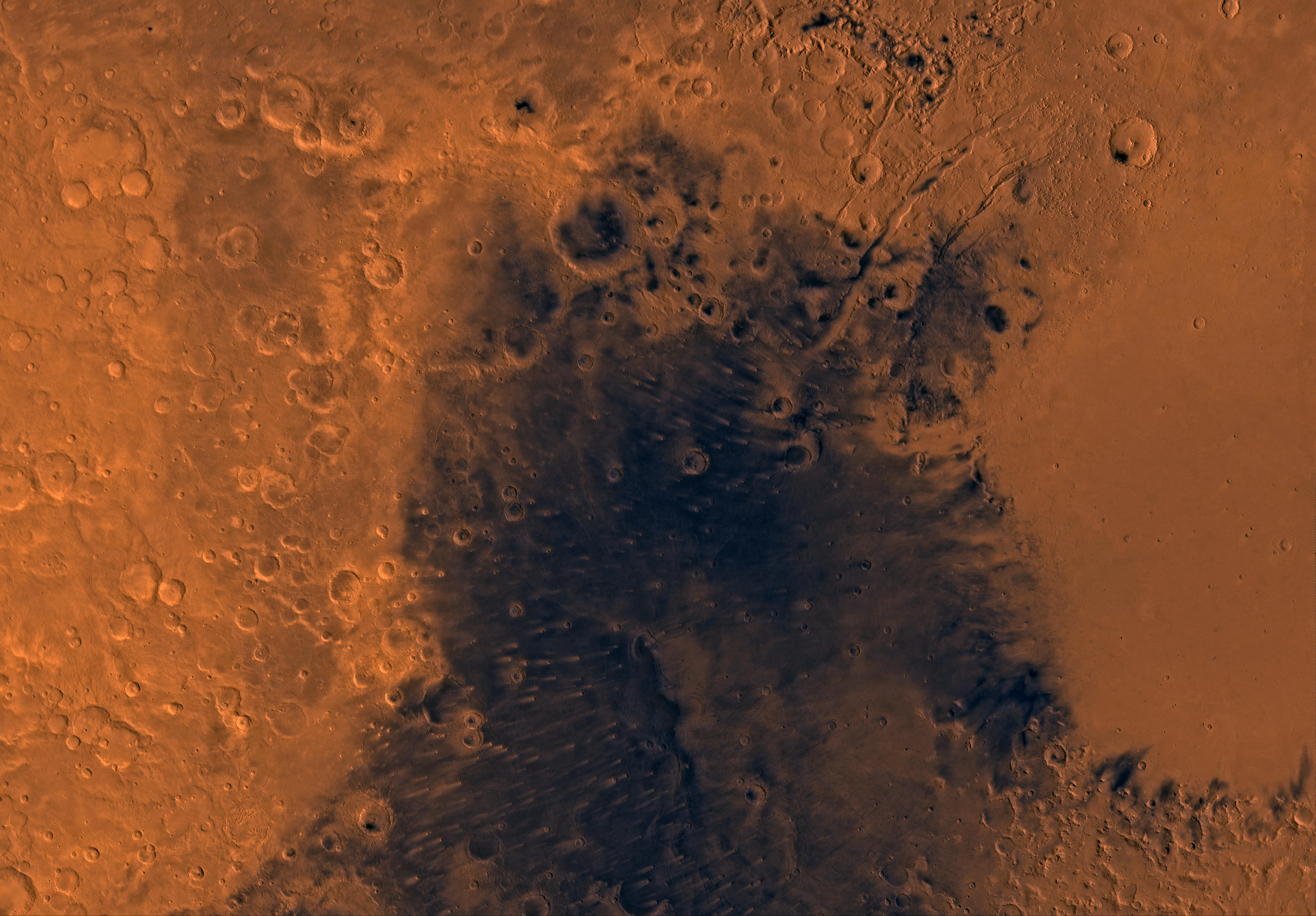
Image of the Syrtis Major Quadrangle (MC-13). The central part contains Syrtis Major Planum. The east includes Isidis basin and the west and north includes heavily cratered highlands.

The Syrtis Major quadrangle is one of a series of 30 quadrangle maps of Mars used by the United States Geological Survey (USGS) Astrogeology Research Program. The Syrtis Major quadrangle is also referred to as MC-13 (Mars Chart-13).

The quadrangle covers longitudes 270° to 315° west and latitudes 0° to 30° north on Mars. Syrtis Major quadrangle includes Syrtis Major Planum and parts of Terra Sabaea and Isidis Planitia.

Syrtis Major is an old shield volcano with a central depression that is elongated in a north–south direction. It contains the calderas Meroe Patera and Nili Patera. Interesting features in the area include dikes and inverted terrain.

The Beagle 2 lander was about to land near the quadrangle, particularly in the eastern part of Isidis Planitia, in December 2003, when contact with the craft was lost. In January 2015, NASA reported the Beagle 2 had been found on the surface in Isidis Planitia (location is about 11.5265°N 90.4295°E). High-resolution images captured by the Mars Reconnaissance Orbiter identified the lost probe, which appears to be intact.

In November 2018, NASA announced that Jezero crater was chosen as the landing site for the planned Mars 2020 rover mission. Jezero crater is in the Syrtis Major quadrangle at (at 18.855°N 77.519°E)

== Discovery and name ==
The name Syrtis Major is derived from the classical Roman name Syrtis maior for the Gulf of Sidra on the coast of Libya (classical Cyrenaica). It is near Cyrene which is the place where "Simon" who carried the cross of Jesus was from.

Syrtis Major is a distinctly dark region standing out against the lighter surrounding highlands, and was the first documented surface feature of another planet. It was discovered by Christiaan Huygens, who included it in a drawing of Mars in 1659. The feature was originally known as the Hourglass Sea but has been given different names by different cartographers. In 1840, Johann Heinrich von Mädler compiled a map of Mars from his observations and called the feature Atlantic Canale. In Richard Proctor's 1867 map it is called then Kaiser Sea (after Frederik Kaiser of the Leiden Observatory). Camille Flammarion called it the Mer du Sablier (French for "Hourglass Sea") when he revised Proctor's nomenclature in 1876. The name "Syrtis Major" was chosen by Giovanni Schiaparelli when he created a map based on observations made during Mars' close approach to Earth in 1877.

== Igneous rocks ==
Syrtis Major is of great interest to geologists because several types of igneous rocks have been found there with orbiting spacecraft. Besides basalt, dacite and granite have been found there. Dacite originates under volcanoes in magma chambers. Dacites form at the top of the chamber, after heavy minerals (olivine and pyroxene) containing iron and magnesium have settled to the bottom. Granite is formed by an even more complex process.

Some areas of Syrtis Major contain large amounts of the mineral olivine. Olivine turns into other minerals very rapidly in the presence of water, so a high abundance of olivine suggests that for a long time little water has been there.

== Minerals ==
A variety of important minerals have been discovered near Nili Fossae, a major trough system in Syrtis major. Besides a large exposure of olivine located in Nili Fossae. Other minerals found there include carbonates, aluminum smectite, iron/magnesium smectite, hydrated silica, kaolinite group minerals, and iron oxides. In December 2008, NASA's Mars Reconnaissance Orbiter found that rocks at Nili Fossae contain carbonate minerals, a geologically significant discovery. In 2009, carbonate rocks were reported in Leighton Crater, which were later estimated to have been buried 4 miles (6 km) below the surface. Finding carbonates in an underground location strongly suggests that Mars was warmer and had more atmospheric carbon dioxide and ancient seas. Because the carbonates were near silicate minerals and clays hydrothermal systems like the deep sea vents on Earth may have been present.

Other minerals found by the MRO are aluminum smectite, iron/magnesium smectite, hydrated silica, kaolinite group minerals, iron oxides, and talc. NASA scientists discovered that Nili Fossae is the source of plumes of methane, raising the question of whether this source originates from biological sources.

Research published in the fall of 2010, describes the discovery of hydrated silica on the flanks of a volcanic cone. The deposit was from a steam fumarole or hot spring, and it represents a recent habitable microenvironment. The 100-meter-high (330 ft) cone rests on the floor of Nili Patera. Observations were obtained with NASA's Mars Reconnaissance Orbiter.

== Dikes ==
Narrow ridges occur in some places on Mars. They may be formed by different means, but some are probably caused by molten rock moving underground, cooling into hard rock, then being exposed by the erosion of softer, surrounding materials. Such a feature is termed a dike. Dikes are often straight. They are common on Earth—some famous ones are Shiprock, New Mexico; around Spanish Peaks, Colorado; and the "Iron Dike" in Rocky Mountain National Park, Colorado.

The discovery on Mars of dikes that were formed from molten rock is highly significant because dikes indicate the existence of intrusive igneous activity. On the Earth such activity is associated with precious metals like gold, silver, and tellurium. Dikes and other intrusive structures are common in the Cripple Creek Mining District of Colorado; the Battle Mountain-Eureka area in north-central Nevada, famous for gold and molybdenum deposits; and around the Franklin dike swarm in Canada. Mapping the presence of dikes allows us to understand how magma (molten rock under the ground) travels and where it could have interacted with surrounding rock, thus producing valuable ores. Deposits of important minerals are also made by dikes and other igneous intrusions heating water which then dissolves minerals that are deposited in cracks in nearby rock. One would expect a great deal of intrusive igneous activity to occur on Mars because it is believed there is more igneous activity under the ground than on top, and Mars has many huge volcanoes.

== Jezero Crater discoveries with Perseverance ==
The Perseverance rover landed in Jesero crater and has greatly increased our understanding of the crater. Although Jezero shows the classic signs of a lake, especially with its deltas, igneous rocks were found. One would have expected just sedimentary rocks. Furthermore, some of the rocks had large crystals that indicated slow cooling. Large crystals are formed in maga bodies after a long period of cooling. The crystals were composed of the mineral olivine surrounded by another mineral called pyroxene. That arrangement happens in thick magma bodies and geologists call this type of texture "Cumulate." In addition basalt lava was found. Minerals that are produced with water, like carbonates, were found as well.

So at this point researchers have pieced together an understanding of the processes and their timing of how Jezero ended it to be how it is. After an impact created the Jezero Crater cavity, hot magma moved into weak parts of the crust and accumulated under the ground forming what are called intrusions. They may be called sills, dikes, or lacoliths depending on their shapes. In these chambers, magma underwent a slow cooling. The rocks with the large crystals were part of a group that was named the Seith Formation. Lava, then came into Jezero. The basalt from the lava flow was called the Maaza Formation. Maaz is rich in the minerals pyroxene and plagioclase. It cooled quicker on the top of a mass of magma or lava. Water has altered the chemistry of the rock because carbonate, iron oxides, amorphous silicates, sulfates, halite, perchlorates, phosphates, and possible phyllosilicates were found in the rock. Erosion removed some of the upper parts of the intrusions, especially the Seith Formation. As a result of this erosion, instruments on Perseverance were able to analyze the minerals in Seith and discover the size and composition of its minerals. Eventually a large lake developed in the crater and made the carbonate minerals found by instruments on Perseverance.

Organic minerals that are probably aromatics or stable molecules of carbon and hydrogen connected to sulfates, were detected. Sulfate minerals can preserve information about the watery environments in which they formed. These molecules were found in a place called "Wildcat Ridge." It is believed to have formed as mud and sand settled in a saltwater lake that was evaporating. The Scanning Habitable Environments with Raman & Luminescence for Organics & Chemicals, or SHERLOC was used for the analysis.

Some rock and mineral fragments that are present in the Skinner Ridge sample hint at originating hundreds of miles outside Jezero Crater. This is from a distance that the rover will not be able to travel, but scientists will still get to examine them when the samples are returned to Earth.

Perseverance may have discovered the remains of life. It found chemicals that may have been created by anaerobic organisms in the past. Speckles in rocks contained the minerals vivianite, an iron phosphate, and greigite, an iron sulfide. What's more both formed in close association with organic carbon. On Earth, vivianite frequently forms in lakes and coastal sediments where microbes use iron in their metabolism. They take iron (III) oxide, use it, and then give off Ferrous iron (II) as a waste. That ferrous iron reacts with phosphate to form vivianite.

Greigite tends to form when microbes break down sulfate. They change sulfate to sulfide which unites with iron to produce greigite. When found together on Earth, these minerals and organic molecules are usually considered a sort of biosignature. There are possible, but not probable ways, that these minerals may have been formed without microbes. They could have been made without biological reactions, including constant high temperatures, acidic conditions, and binding by organic compounds. But, the rocks in this place, called Bright Angel, do not show evidence that they experienced high temperatures or acidic conditions, and it is unknown whether the organic compounds present would’ve been capable of catalyzing the reaction at the expected low temperatures. This chemical evidence of past life appeared in some of the youngest sedimentary rocks the mission has examined. For a long time, we assumed signs of ancient life would be only found in older rock formations. This discovery may mean that Mars could have been habitable for a longer period or later in the planet's history than previously thought. Older rocks also might hold signs of life that are simply harder to detect. The truth about these rocks may not be really known until the samples that were gathered are brought to the Earth.

=== Linear ridge networks ===
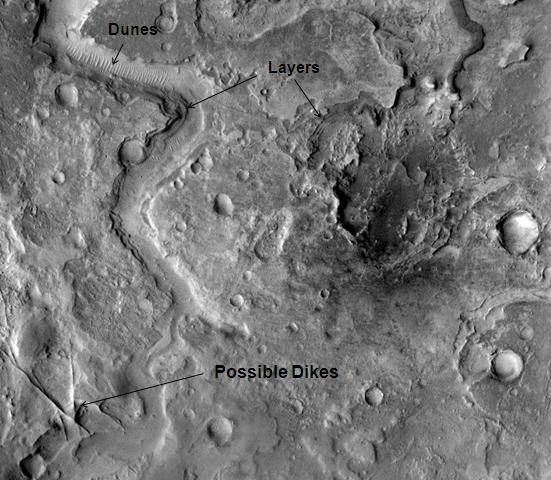
Huo Hsing Vallis in Syrtis Major, as seen by THEMIS. Straight ridges may be dikes in which liquid rock once flowed.

Some crater floors in the Syrtis Major area show elongated ridges in a lattice-like pattern. Such patterns are typical of faults and breccia dikes formed as a result of an impact. Some have suggested that these linear ridge networks are dikes made up of molten rock; others have advanced the idea that other fluids such as water were involved. The ridges are found where there has been enhanced erosion. Pictures below show examples of these dikes. Water may flow along faults. The water often carries minerals that serve to cement rock materials thus making them harder. Later when the whole area undergoes erosion the dikes will remain as ridges because they are more resistant to erosion. This discovery may be of great importance for future colonization of Mars because these types of faults and breccia dikes on earth are associated with key mineral resources. It has been estimated that 25% of the Earth's impacts are connected to mineral production. The largest gold deposit on Earth is the Vredefort 300 km diameter impact structure in South Africa. Perhaps, when people live on Mars these kinds of areas will be mined as they are on earth.

== Streaks ==
Many areas of Mars change their shape and/or coloration. For many years, astronomers observing regular changes on Mars when the seasons changed, thought that what they saw was evidence of vegetation growing. After close-up inspection with a number of spacecraft, other causes were discovered. Basically, the changes are caused by the effects of the wind blowing dust around. Sometimes, fine bright dust settles on the dark basalt rock making the surface appear lighter, at other times the light-toned dust will be blown away; thus making the surface darken—just as if vegetation were growing. Mars has frequent regional or global dust storms that coat the surface with fine bright dust. In the THEMIS image below, white streaks are seen downwind of craters. The streaks are not too bright; they appear bright because of contrast with the dark volcanic rock basalt which makes up the surface.

== Inverted relief ==
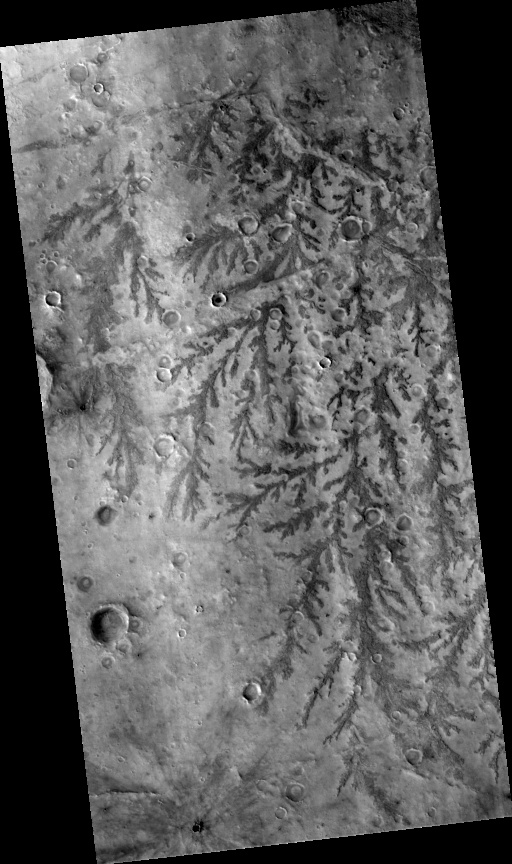
Inverted Channel with many branches in Syrtis Major quadrangle

Some places on Mars show inverted relief. In these locations, a stream bed may be a raised feature, instead of a valley. The inverted former stream channels may be caused by the deposition of large rocks or due to cementation. In either case erosion would erode the surrounding land and leave the old channel as a raised ridge because the ridge would be more resistant to erosion. Images below, taken with HiRISE show sinuous ridges that are old channels that have become inverted.

== Methane ==
For several years, researchers have found methane in the atmosphere of Mars. After study, it was determined to be coming from a point in Syrtis Major, located at 10° N and 50° E. A recent study indicates that to match the observations of methane, there must be something that quickly destroys the gas, otherwise it would be spread all through the atmosphere instead of being concentrated in one location. There may be something in the soil that oxidizes the gas before it has a chance to spread. If this is so, that same chemical would destroy organic compounds, thus life would be very difficult on Mars.

== Channels ==
There is enormous evidence that water once flowed in river valleys on Mars. Images of curved channels have been seen in images from Mars spacecraft dating back to the early 1970s with the Mariner 9 orbiter. Indeed, a study published in June 2017, calculated that the volume of water needed to carve all the channels on Mars was even larger than the proposed ocean that the planet may have had. Water was probably recycled many times from the ocean to rainfall around Mars.

== See also ==
- Flammarion (Martian crater) – Crater on Mars
- Geology of Mars – Geology of fourth planet from the Sun
- Groundwater on Mars – Water held in permeable ground
- HiWish program – NASA program for public suggestions for MRO images
- Hydrothermal circulation – Circulation of water driven by heat exchange
- Igneous differentiation – Geologic process in formation of some igneous rocks
- Jezero (crater)
- Lakes on Mars – Former bodies of water on Mars
- List of quadrangles on Mars – Geographic subunits of the surface of Mars
- MOC Public Targeting Program – Program following the Mars Global Surveyor's pictures of Mars
- Ore genesis – How the various types of mineral deposits form within the Earth's crust
- Ore resources on Mars – Ore deposits on Mars that may be useful to future colonists
- Outflow channels – Long, wide swathes of scoured ground on Mars
- Perseverance (rover)
- Valley network (Mars) – Branching networks of valleys on Mars
- Vallis – Valley landform on other planets (mostly Mars)
- Water on Mars – Study of past and present water on Mars

MC-01 Mare Boreum (features)
MC-02 Diacria (features)		MC-03 Arcadia (features)	MC-04 Acidalium (features)	MC-05 Ismenius Lacus (features)		MC-06 Casius (features)	MC-07 Cebrenia (features)
MC-08 Amazonis (features)	MC-09 Tharsis (features)	MC-10 Lunae Palus (features)	MC-11 Oxia Palus (features)	MC-12 Arabia (features)	MC-13 Syrtis Major (features)	MC-14 Amenthes (features)	MC-15 Elysium (features)
MC-16 Memnonia (features)	MC-17 Phoenicis Lacus (features)	MC-18 Coprates (features)	MC-19 Margaritifer Sinus (features)	MC-20 Sinus Sabaeus (features)	MC-21 Iapygia (features)	MC-22 Mare Tyrrhenum (features)	MC-23 Aeolis (features)
MC-24 Phaethontis (features)		MC-25 Thaumasia (features)	MC-26 Argyre (features)	MC-27 Noachis (features)		MC-28 Hellas (features)	MC-29 Eridania (features)
MC-30 Mare Australe (features)
