= Wafi =

Wafi (وفی spelling in Dari/Farsi, or spelling in Arabic وافي) is an Arabic name that means "reliable", "faithful", "trustworthy", or "loyal". Notable people with the name include:

- Abolghasem Wafi Yazdi (born 1965), Shia cleric
- Ahmad al-Wafi (766–828), Ismaili imam
- Wafi Aminuddin (born 2000), Bruneian footballer
- Wafi Salih (born 1965), Venezuelan-born writer

== See also ==
- Al-Wafi, a Hadith collection
- Bilad al-Wafi, Taiz Governorate, Yemen
- Wafi-Golpu mine, Papua New Guinea
- Wafi City, Dubai, United Arab Emirates
- Wafi Mall, Dubai, United Arab Emirates
- Wafi Energy Pakistan
