= Mars carbonate catastrophe =

Past event on the planet Mars

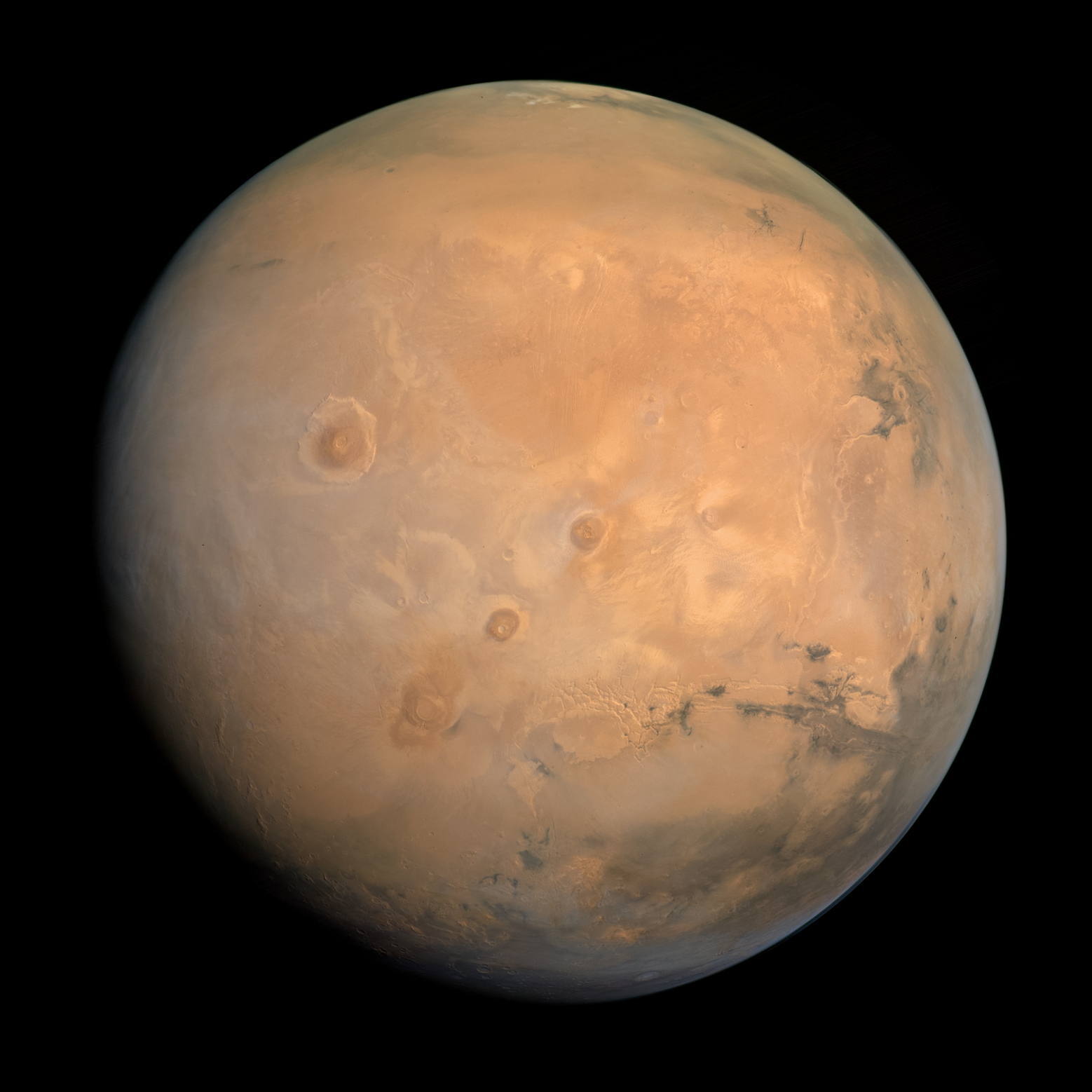
Mars in true color, taken by the Emirates Mars Mission on 30 August 2021, when Mars was in northern solstice

The Mars carbonate catastrophe was an event that happened on Mars in its early history. Evidence shows Mars was once warmer and wet about 4 billion years ago, or about 560 million years after the formation of Mars. Mars quickly, over a 1 to 12 million year time span, lost its water, becoming cold and very dry. Factors in Mars losing its water and most of its atmosphere are the carbonate catastrophe, loss of the planet's magnetic field and Mars's low gravity. Mars's low gravity and loss of a magnetic field allowed the Sun's solar wind to strip away most of Mars's atmosphere and water into outer space.

== Carbonate catastrophe ==
Water (H_{2}O) is very abundant in the universe, so when Mars formed during the formation of the Solar System it had water. The water on early Mars reacted with atmospheric carbon dioxide (CO_{2}). This reaction formed carbonic acid which became part of the water cycle on Mars. The carbonic acid rain produced carbonates on the planet. The carbonates removed (leached) greenhouse gases, water vapor, and carbon dioxide from the atmosphere. Carbonates remain present on Mars. Early greenhouse gases came from Mars's early magma, planetesimals and comets. The carbonate catastrophe ended the Noachian period. Mars's interior cooled, so it did not develop plate tectonics and a carbon cycle as Earth did. Thus, Earth did not develop a carbonate catastrophe. Mars's interior cooling also ended volcanic activity on Mars.

== Magnetic field of Mars ==
There is evidence that early Mars had a magnetic field, like the magnetic field of Earth. The Magnetic field of Mars ended quickly after the formation of the planet as the core of Mars is made of much lighter elements and is much smaller than Earth's core. Without a magnetic field the Sun's solar wind, made of charged particles, including plasma, electrons, protons and alpha particles stripped away most of the atmosphere and water on Mars.

== Gravity of Mars ==
Mars's gravity is only 37.5% that of Earth, that is 100 kg has a weight of about 980 Newtons on Earth would be about 367.5 Newtons on Mars. The low gravity is due to Mars's small size and also its lower density. Mars's mass is only 11% of Earth's mass. Mars's diameter is 4,213 miles (6,780 kilometres) and the diameter of Earth is 7,926 miles (12,756 kilometres).

== Mars today ==
Mars today is very different than its early history, pre-carbonate catastrophe. Mars today:

- Mars's atmosphere is 95% carbon dioxide, 3% nitrogen, 1.6% argon. Earth's atmosphere is 78% nitrogen, 21% oxygen, 0.9% argon, 0.04% carbon dioxide.
- Mars has only about 0.7% of the atmospheric pressure of Earth. Mars's atmosphere is about 6.5 millibar, Earth's atmosphere is 1013 millibar. Surface of Mars is like Earth at 100,000 feet (30 kilometres) in the stratosphere.
- Mars's atmosphere has a humidity of 0.03%; Earth's average humidity is about 50% (lowest 0.36%, high 100%).
- Intense ultraviolet solar radiation, due to thin atmosphere.
- Intense solar radiation and cosmic rays due to lack of magnetic field.
- Alkaline pH soil at 8.3, due to chlorine in the soil. Earth's average soil pH is about 6.5.
- Virtually no oxygen at 0.13%. Earth at about 21% oxygen.
- Mars is covered in dry iron oxide dust, has seasonal global dust storms, with a duration of about a month.
- Mars's average global temperature is −81 °F (−63 °C; 210 K), Earth's average global temperature is 57 °F (14 °C; 287 K).
- The seasonal Martian polar ice caps are mostly dry ice, frozen carbon dioxide atmosphere (CO_{2}).
- Comets falling on Mars bring some water and ice to Mars. The thin Martian atmosphere means the freezing, evaporation, and boiling point of water is all at the same temperature. Thus liquid water cannot exist on the surface of Mars .

== See also ==
- Chloride-bearing deposits on Mars
- Composition of Mars
- Geology of Mars
- List of quadrangles on Mars
- List of rocks on Mars
- Martian soil
- Mineralogy of Mars
- Ore resources on Mars
