= Carbonates on Mars =

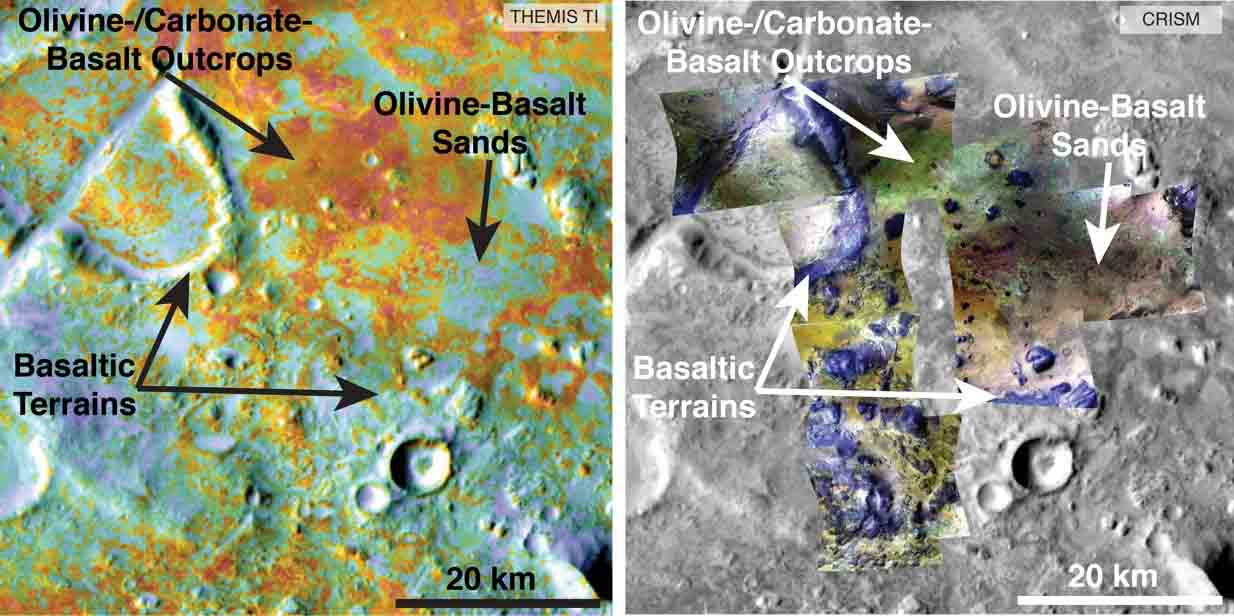
Estimating carbon in the Nili Fossae plains region of Mars from orbiters (2 September 2015).

The formation of carbonates on Mars have been suggested based on evidence of the presence of liquid water and atmospheric carbon dioxide in the planet's early stages. Moreover, due to their utility in registering changes in environmental conditions such as pH, temperature, fluid composition, carbonates have been considered as a primary target for planetary scientists' research. However, since their first detection in 2008, the large deposits of carbonates that were once expected on Mars have not been found, leading to multiple potential explanations that can explain why carbonates did not form massively on the planet.

== Mars probes ==
Previously, most remote sensing instruments such as OMEGA and THEMIS—sensitive to infrared emissivity spectral features of carbonates—had not suggested the presence of carbonate outcrops, at least at the 100 m or coarser spatial scales available from the returned data.

Though ubiquitous, a 2003 study of carbonates on Mars showed that they are dominated by magnesite (MgCO_{3}) in Martian dust, had mass fractions less than 5%, and could have formed under current atmospheric conditions. Furthermore, with the exception of the surface dust component, by 2007 carbonates had not been detected by any in situ mission, even though mineralogic modeling did not preclude small amounts of calcium carbonate in Independence class rocks of Husband Hill in Gusev crater. (note: An IAU naming convention within Gusev is not yet established).

== Remote sensing data ==
The first successful identification of a strong infrared spectral signature from surficial carbonate minerals of local scale (< 10 km^{2}) was made by the MRO-CRISM team in 2008. Spectral modeling in 2007 identified a key deposit in Nili Fossae dominated by a single mineral phase that was spatially associated with olivine outcrops. The dominant mineral appeared to be magnesite, while morphology inferred with HiRISE and thermal properties suggested that the deposit was lithic. Stratigraphically, this layer appeared between phyllosilicates below and mafic cap rocks above, temporally between the Noachian and Hesperian eras. Even though infrared spectra are representative of minerals to less than ≈0.1 mm depths (in contrast to gamma spectra which are sensitive to tens of cm depths), stratigraphic, morphologic, and thermal properties are consistent with the existence of the carbonate as outcrop rather than alteration rinds. Nevertheless, the morphology was distinct from typical terrestrial sedimentary carbonate layers suggesting formation from local aqueous alteration of olivine and other igneous minerals. However, key implications were that the alteration would have occurred under moderate pH and that the resulting carbonates were not exposed to sustained low pH aqueous conditions even as recently as the Hesperian.

Evidence for widespread presence of carbonates began to increase in 2009, when low levels (<10%) of Mg-rich carbonates were found across the Martian area of Syrtis Major, Margaritifer Terra, Lunae Planum, Elysium Planitia, as reported from analysis of data acquired by the Planetary Fourier Spectrometer (PFS) on board the Mars Express spacecraft.

When the Thermal and Evolved Gas Analyzer (TEGA) and WCL experiments on the 2009 Phoenix Mars lander found between 3–5wt% calcite (CaCO_{3}) and an alkaline soil. In 2010 analyses by the Mars Exploration Rover Spirit, identified outcrops rich in magnesium-iron carbonate (16–34 wt%) in the Columbia Hills of Gusev crater, most likely precipitated from carbonate-bearing solutions under hydrothermal conditions at near-neutral pH in association with volcanic activity during the Noachian era.

After Spirit Rover stopped working scientists studied old data from the Miniature Thermal Emission Spectrometer, or Mini-TES and confirmed the presence of large amounts of carbonate-rich rocks, which means that regions of the planet may have once harbored water. The carbonates were discovered in an outcrop of rocks called "Comanche."

Carbonates (calcium or iron carbonates) were discovered in a crater on the rim of Huygens Crater, located in the Iapygia quadrangle. The impact on the rim exposed material that had been dug up from the impact that created Huygens. These minerals represent evidence that Mars once had a thicker carbon dioxide atmosphere with abundant moisture. These kind of carbonates only form when there is a lot of water. They were found with the Compact Reconnaissance Imaging Spectrometer for Mars (CRISM) instrument on the Mars Reconnaissance Orbiter. Earlier, the instrument had detected clay minerals. The carbonates were found near the clay minerals. Both of these minerals form in wet environments. It is supposed that billions of years age Mars was much warmer and wetter. At that time, carbonates would have formed from water and the carbon dioxide-rich atmosphere. Later the deposits of carbonate would have been buried. The double impact has now exposed the minerals. Earth has vast carbonate deposits in the form of limestone.

Carbonates found on Mars
	Name	Mission	
MgCO3	magnesite	remote sensing, MRO-CRISM	2008
MgCO3	magnesite	remote sensing Mars Express-PFS	2009
CaCO3	calcite	Phoenix	2009
FeCO3	siderite	Curiosity	2020

== Absence of carbonates on Mars ==
Geological and geomorphological evidence has reinforced the idea of the presence of liquid water on early Mars. Therefore, abundant precipitation of carbonates from atmospheric and water reactions is expected. However, spectral imaging has revealed only small amounts of carbonates, generating doubts about humans' understanding of geological processes on Mars. To overcome this problem, scientists have proposed explanations that reconcile the absence of carbonates with the presence of a CO_{2}-rich atmosphere and liquid water.

=== Cold and dry early Martian environments ===
According to this explanation, the early Martian conditions are similar to those at present. Essentially, it suggests that carbonates are absent because the planet never experienced conditions that included the presence of liquid water and a CO_{2}-rich thick atmosphere. Even if this explanation provides an insight in the reasons why carbonates are not present, it is in disagreement with the geomorphological and mineralogical evidence supporting the existence of liquid water on Mars's surface.

=== Inability of detection with current technology ===
This hypothesis establishes that the Thermal Emission Spectrometer (TES) aboard the Mars Global Surveyor spacecraft and the Thermal Emission Imaging System (THEMIS) on board the Mars Odyssey spacecraft are unable to detect carbonates. According to this notion, the carbonates indeed formed and are still exist on Mars, but they remain undetected due to the limited sensitivity of the current tools used for mineralogical detection on the planet.

=== Secondary chemical alteration ===
This concept involves the potential for secondary chemical alteration of ancient carbonates on Mars, due to the formation of acid rain resulting from the combination of water vapor and sulfates. The consequence of this process implies the chemical decomposition of superficial carbonates layers, as carbonates are not resistant to acidic pH conditions; acid-fog weathering; and photo-decomposition.

=== Hidden carbonate deposits ===
According to this perspective, massive carbonates deposits formed but are hidden beneath several layers of secondary alteration rocks, preventing their identification on the surface. Other alternatives to this hypothesis include: Masking of carbonates as a consequence of the abundant soils on Mars; and resurfacing processes that have covered carbonate deposits, such as eolian deposition and late sedimentation processes.

=== Inhibition due to acidic conditions ===
Finally, this hypothesis defends the idea that carbonates never precipitated because the pH conditions of the environment were too acidic to allow carbonates to precipitate, or at least siderite, which is the primary carbonate mineral expected to precipitate first. The acidic conditions are derived from the high partial pressures of atmospheric carbon dioxide, as well as a persistent sulfate and iron enrichment that affect the optimal conditions for carbonates to precipitate.

== Gallery ==
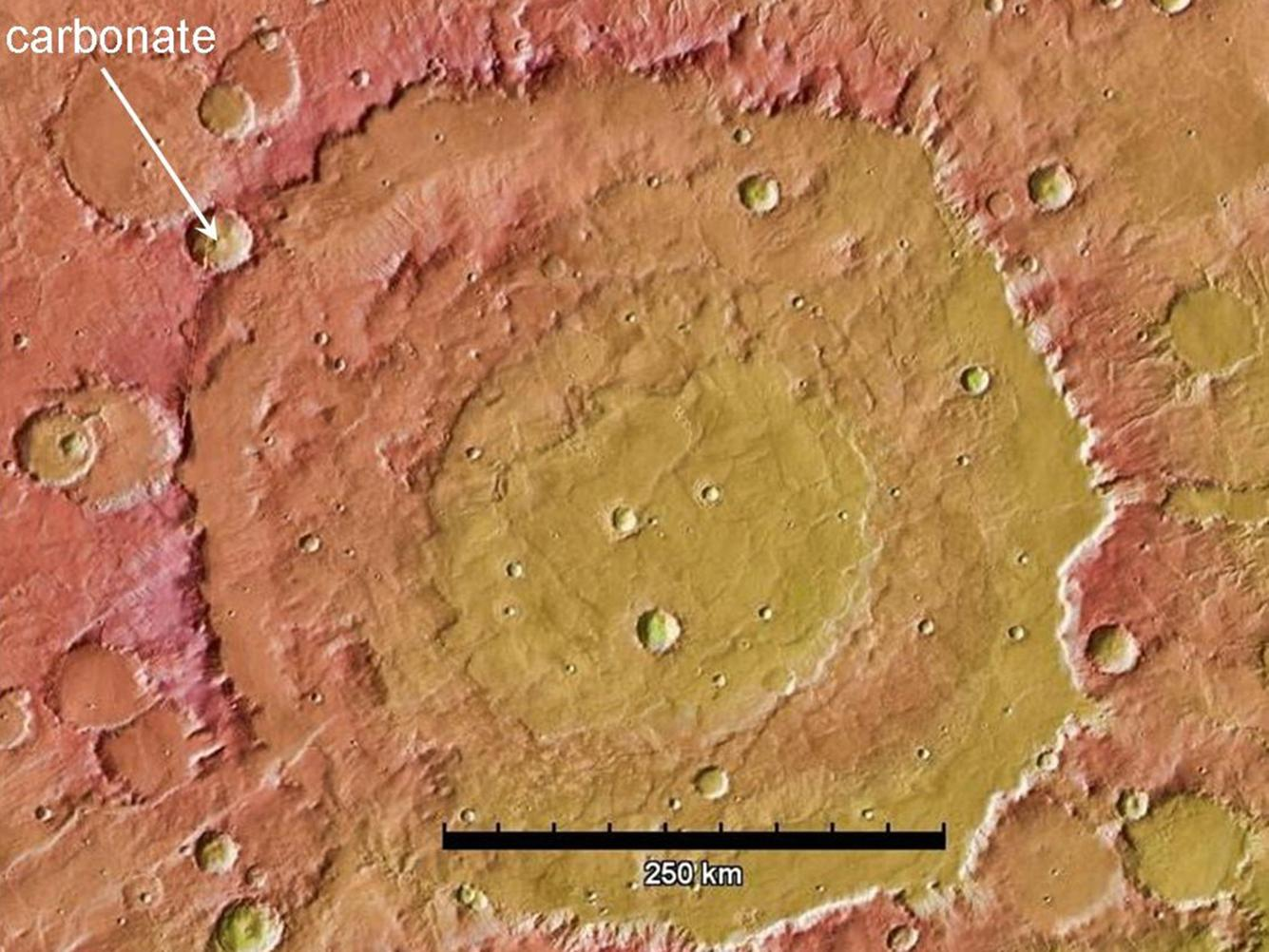
Huygens Crater - circle shows location of carbonate deposit - representing a time when Mars had abundant liquid water on its surface (Scale bar = 259 km).

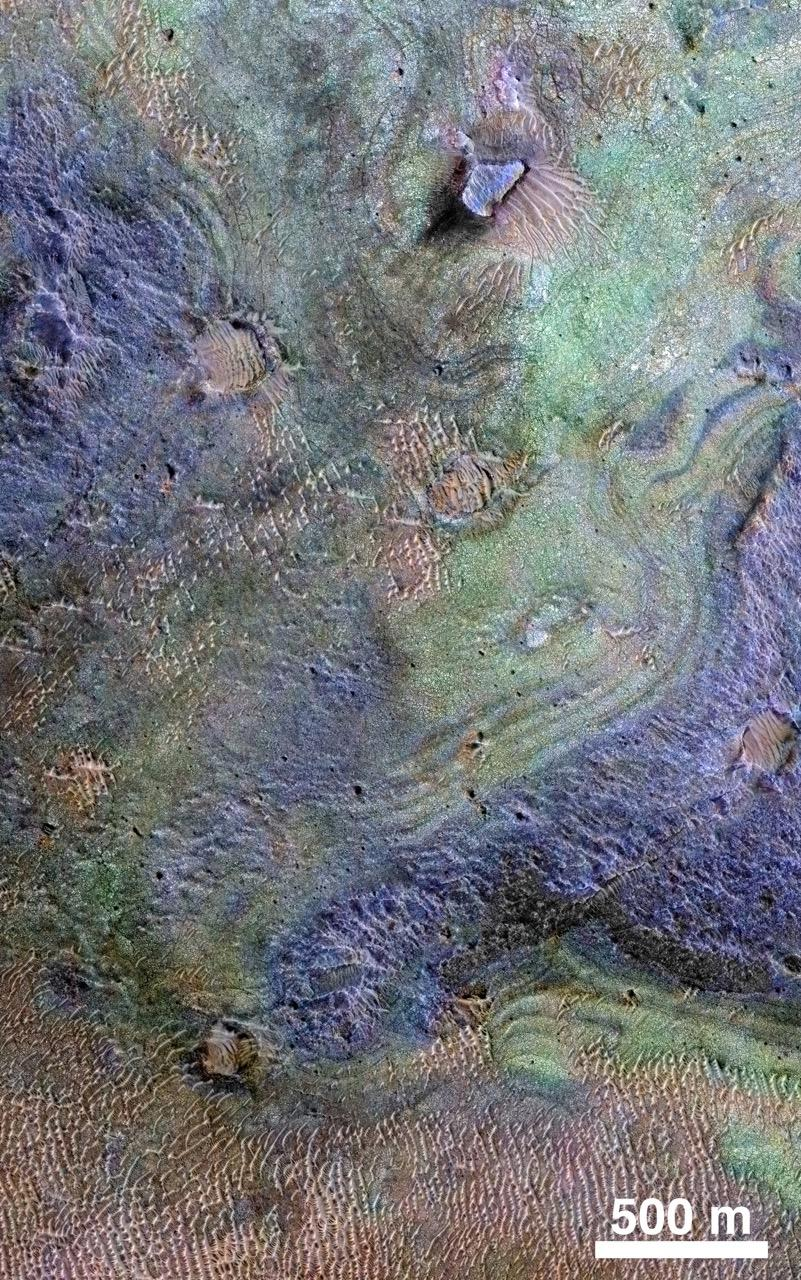
Nili Fossae on Mars - largest known carbonate deposit.

== See also ==
- Areography (geography of Mars) – Delineation and characterization of Martian regions
- Chemical gardening – Demonstration of metallic salts crystallization
- Chloride-bearing deposits on Mars
- Composition of Mars – Branch of the geology of Mars
- Elysium Planitia – Broad plain that straddles the equator of Mars
- Fretted terrain – Surface feature common to certain areas of Mars
- Geology of Mars – Geology of fourth planet from the Sun
- Glaciers on Mars – Extraterrestrial bodies of ice
- Gravity of Mars – Gravitational force exerted by the planet Mars
- Groundwater on Mars – Water held in permeable ground
- Hecates Tholus – Martian volcano
- Iapygia quadrangle – Map of Mars
- Lakes on Mars – Former bodies of water on Mars
- Life on Mars – Assessments of possible life on Mars
- List of quadrangles on Mars – Geographic subunits of the surface of Mars
- List of rocks on Mars
- Magnetic field of Mars – Past magnetic field of the planet Mars
- Mars Geyser Hopper – Proposed robotic mission to explore carbon dioxide geysers on Mars
- Martian craters
- Martian dichotomy – Geomorphological feature of Mars
- Martian geyser – Putative CO2 gas and dust eruptions on Mars
- Martian gullies – Incised networks of narrow channels and sediments on Mars
- Martian soil – Fine regolith found on the surface of Mars
- Mineralogy of Mars
- Ore resources on Mars – Ore deposits on Mars that may be useful to future colonists
- Scientific information from the Mars Exploration Rover mission
- Seasonal flows on warm Martian slopes – Surface features on Mars
- Vallis (planetary geology) – Valley landform on other planets (mostly Mars)
- Water on Mars – Study of past and present water on Mars
- Mars carbonate catastrophe – Past event on the planet Mars
