= Porphyry copper deposit =

Type of copper ore body

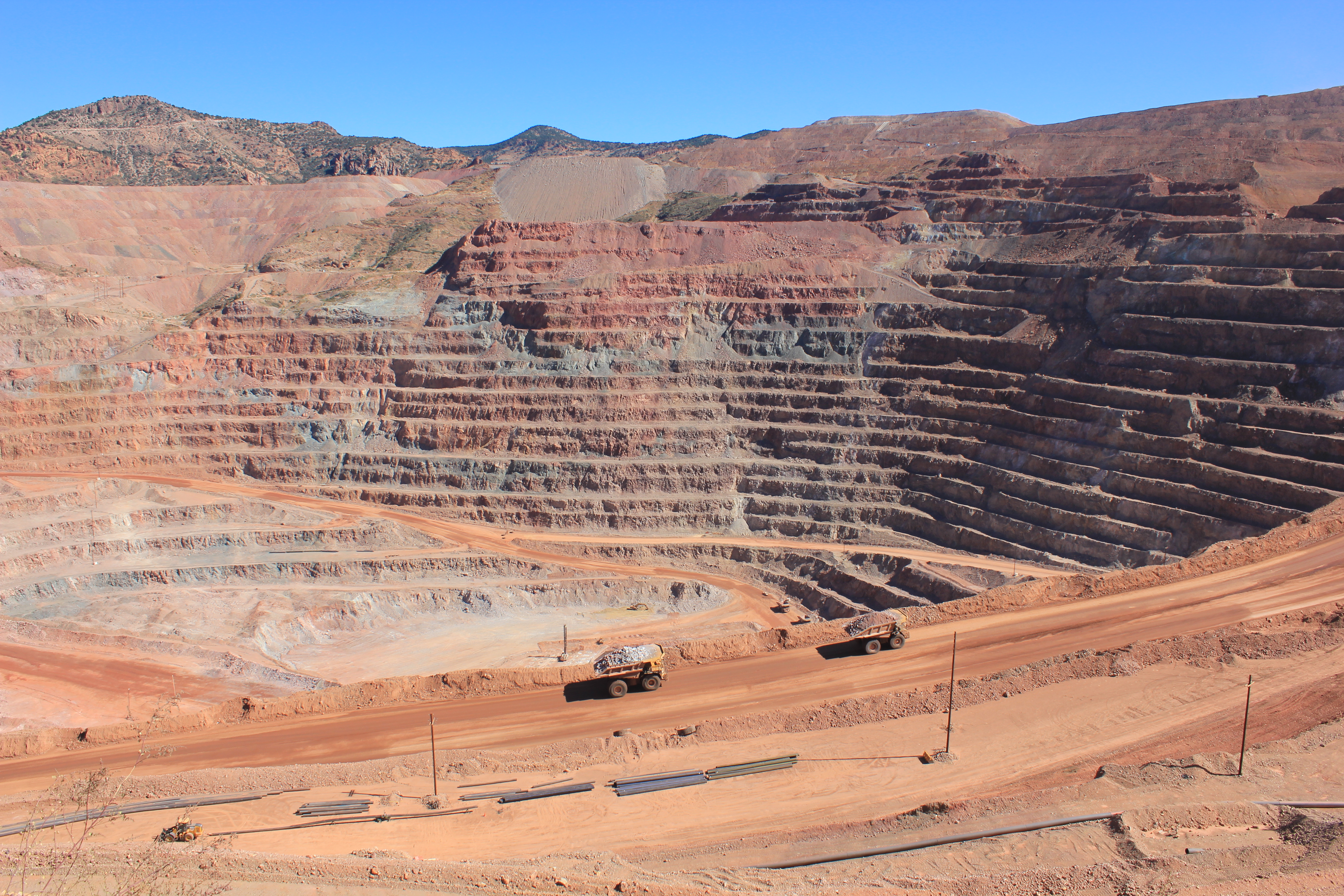
Morenci mine open pit in 2012. The red rocks in the upper benches, and the outcrops in the background, are in the leached capping. It appears that the bottom of the pit is in the mixed oxide-sulfide zone, and that is also what the two haul trucks in the foreground are carrying.

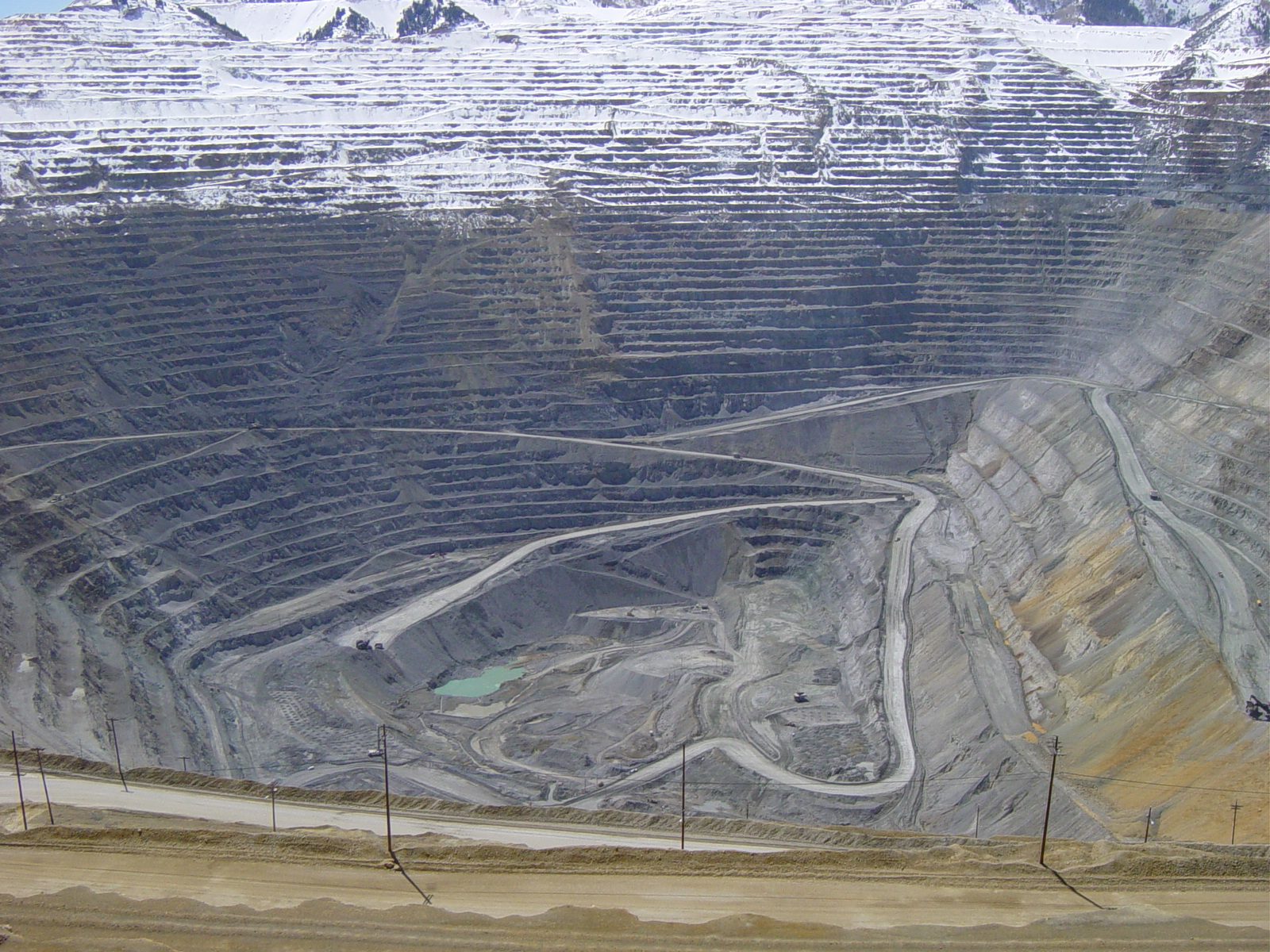
Bingham Canyon mine in 2005. The gray rocks visible in the pit are almost all in the primary-sulfide ore zone.

Porphyry copper deposits are copper ore bodies that are formed from hydrothermal fluids that originate from a voluminous magma chamber several kilometers below the deposit itself. Predating or associated with those fluids are vertical dikes of porphyritic intrusive rocks from which this deposit type derives its name. In later stages, circulating meteoric fluids may interact with the magmatic fluids. Successive envelopes of hydrothermal alteration typically enclose a core of disseminated ore minerals in often stockwork-forming hairline fractures and veins. Because of their large volume, porphyry orebodies can be economic from copper concentrations as low as 0.15% copper and can have economic amounts of by-products such as molybdenum, silver, and gold. In some mines, those metals are the main product.

The first mining of low-grade copper porphyry deposits from large open pits coincided roughly with the introduction of steam shovels, the construction of railroads, and a surge in market demand near the start of the 20th century. Some mines exploit porphyry deposits that contain sufficient gold or molybdenum, but little or no copper.

Porphyry copper deposits are currently the largest source of copper ore. Most of the known porphyry deposits are concentrated in: western South and North America and Southeast Asia and Oceania – along the Pacific Ring of Fire; the Caribbean; southern central Europe and the area around eastern Turkey; scattered areas in China, the Mideast, Russia, and the CIS states; and eastern Australia. Only a few are identified in Africa, in Namibia and Zambia; none are known in Antarctica. The greatest concentration of the largest copper porphyry deposits is in northern Chile. Almost all mines exploiting large porphyry deposits produce from open pits.

== Geological overview ==
=== Geological background and economic significance ===
Porphyry copper deposits represent an important resource and the dominant source of copper that is mined today to satisfy global demand. Via compilation of geological data, it has been found that the majority of porphyry deposits are Phanerozoic in age and were emplaced at depths of approximately 1 to 6 kilometres with vertical thicknesses on average of 2 kilometres. Throughout the Phanerozoic an estimated 125,895 porphyry copper deposits were formed; however, 62% of them (78,106) have been removed by uplift and erosion. Thus, 38% (47,789) remain in the crust, of which there are 574 known deposits that are at the surface. It is estimated that the Earth's porphyry copper deposits contain approximately 1.7×10^{11} tonnes of copper, equivalent to more than 8,000 years of global mine production.

Porphyry deposits represent an important resource of copper; however, they are also important sources of gold and molybdenum – with porphyry deposits being the dominant source of the latter. In general, porphyry deposits are characterized by low grades of ore mineralization, a porphyritic intrusive complex that is surrounded by a vein stockwork and hydrothermal breccias. Porphyry deposits are formed in arc-related settings and are associated with subduction zone magmas. Porphyry deposits are clustered in discrete mineral provinces, which implies that there is some form of geodynamic control or crustal influence affecting the location of porphyry formation. Porphyry deposits tend to occur in linear, orogen-parallel belts (such as the Andes in South America).

There also appear to be discrete time periods in which porphyry deposit formation was concentrated or preferred. For copper-molybdenum porphyry deposits, formation is broadly concentrated in three time periods: Palaeocene-Eocene, Eocene-Oligocene, and middle Miocene-Pliocene. For both porphyry and epithermal gold deposits, they are generally from the time period ranging from the middle Miocene to the Recent period, however notable exceptions are known. Most large-scale porphyry deposits have an age of less than 20 million years, however there are notable exceptions, such as the 438 million-year-old Cadia-Ridgeway deposit in New South Wales. This relatively young age reflects the preservation potential of this type of deposit; as they are typically located in zones of highly active tectonic and geological processes, such as deformation, uplift, and erosion. It may be however, that the skewed distribution towards most deposits being less than 20 million years is at least partially an artifact of exploration methodology and model assumptions, as large examples are known in areas which were previously left only partially or under-explored partly due to their perceived older host rock ages, but which were then later found to contain large, world-class examples of much older porphyry copper deposits.

=== Magmas and mantle processes ===
In general, the majority of large porphyry deposits are associated with calc-alkaline intrusions, although some of the largest gold-rich deposits are associated with high-K calc-alkaline magma compositions. Numerous world-class porphyry copper-gold deposits are hosted by high-K or shoshonitic intrusions, such as Bingham copper-gold mine in USA, Grasberg copper-gold mine in Indonesia, Northparkes copper-gold mine in Australia, Oyu Tolgoi copper-gold mine in Mongolia and Peschanka copper-gold prospect in Russia.

The magmas responsible for porphyry formation are conventionally thought to be generated by the partial melting of the upper part of post-subduction, stalled slabs that are altered by seawater. Shallow subduction of young, buoyant slabs can result in the production of adakitic lavas via partial melting. Alternatively, metasomatised mantle wedges can produce highly oxidized conditions that results in sulfide minerals releasing ore minerals (copper, gold, molybdenum), which are then able to be transported to upper crustal levels. Mantle melting can also be induced by transitions from convergent to transform margins, as well as the steepening and trenchward retreat of the subducted slab. However, the latest belief is that dehydration that occurs at the blueschist-eclogite transition affects most subducted slabs, rather than partial melting.

After dehydration, solute-rich fluids are released from the slab and metasomatise the overlying mantle wedge of MORB-like asthenosphere, enriching it with volatiles and large ion lithophile elements (LILE). The current belief is that the generation of andesitic magmas is multistage, and involves crustal melting and assimilation of primary basaltic magmas, magma storage at the base of the crust (underplating by dense, mafic magma as it ascends), and magma homogenization. The underplated magma will add a lot of heat to the base of the crust, thereby inducing crustal melting and assimilation of lower-crustal rocks, creating an area with intense interaction of the mantle magma and crustal magma. This progressively evolving magma will become enriched in volatiles, sulfur, and incompatible elements – an ideal combination for the generation of a magma capable of generating an ore deposit. From this point forward in the evolution of a porphyry deposit, ideal tectonic and structural conditions are necessary to allow the transport of the magma and ensure its emplacement in upper-crustal levels.

=== Tectonic and structural controls ===
Although porphyry deposits are associated with arc volcanism, they are not the typical products in that environment. It is believed that tectonic change acts as a trigger for porphyry formation. There are five key factors that can give rise to porphyry development: 1) compression impeding magma ascent through crust, 2) a resultant larger shallow magma chamber, 3) enhanced fractionation of the magma along with volatile saturation and generation of magmatic-hydrothermal fluids, 4) compression restricts offshoots from developing into the surrounding rock, thus concentrating the fluid into a single stock, and 5) rapid uplift and erosion promotes decompression and efficient, eventual deposition of ore.

Porphyry deposits are commonly developed in regions that are zones of low-angle (flat-slab) subduction. A subduction zone that transitions from normal to flat and then back to normal subduction produces a series of effects that can lead to the generation of porphyry deposits. Initially, there will be decreased alkalic magmatism, horizontal shortening, hydration of the lithosphere above the flat-slab, and low heat flow. Upon a return to normal subduction, the hot asthenosphere will once again interact with the hydrated mantle, causing wet melting, crustal melting will ensue as mantle melts pass through, and lithospheric thinning and weakening due to the increased heat flow. The subducting slab can be lifted by aseismic ridges, seamount chains, or oceanic plateaus – which can provide a favourable environment for the development of a porphyry deposit. This interaction between subduction zones and the aforementioned oceanic features can explain the development of multiple metallogenic belts in a given region; as each time the subduction zone interacts with one of these features it can lead to ore genesis. Finally, in oceanic island arcs, ridge subduction can lead to slab flattening or arc reversal; whereas, in continental arcs it can lead to periods of flat slab subduction.

Arc reversal has been shown to slightly pre-date the formation of porphyry deposits in the south-west Pacific, after a collisional event. Arc reversal occurs due to collision between an island arc and either another island arc, a continent, or an oceanic plateau. The collision may result in the termination of subduction and thereby induce mantle melting.

Porphyry deposits do not generally have any requisite structural controls for their formation; although major faults and lineaments are associated with some. The presence of intra-arc fault systems are beneficial, as they can localize porphyry development. Furthermore, some authors have indicated that the occurrence of intersections between continent-scale traverse fault zones and arc-parallel structures are associated with porphyry formation. This is actually the case of Chile's Los Bronces and El Teniente porphyry copper deposits each of which lies at the intersection of two fault systems.

Recent research done in the Central Andes focused on the observation that many smaller porphyry deposits tend to be clustered around a giant porphyry of the same age. An analysis was done in two locations, one in Northern Argentina, one in Peru, where structural features like fault orientation, sense of shear, and cleavage directions were recorded over regional and continental scales. Continental-scale magnetic and gravimetric surveys were also conducted. It was found that commonly known orogen-parallel fault systems were intersected by other fault systems called 'structural corridors'. These corridors were likely ancient fault systems created by orogenic events that predated the more recent Andean orogeny. Porphyry locations were then compared to the location of these fault systems. It was determined that orogen-parallel belts are a primary factor in porphyry location, and structural corridors are a close second. The authors suggested that high stress events pushed magma preferentially up vertical channels created by the intersection of these structural features, where it eventually created the porphyry deposits.

It has been proposed that "misoriented" deep-seated faults that were inactive during magmatism are important zones where porphyry copper-forming magmas stagnate allowing them to achieve their typical igneous differentiation. At a given time differentiated magmas would burst violently out of these fault-traps and head to shallower places in the crust where porphyry copper deposits would be formed.

== Characteristics ==
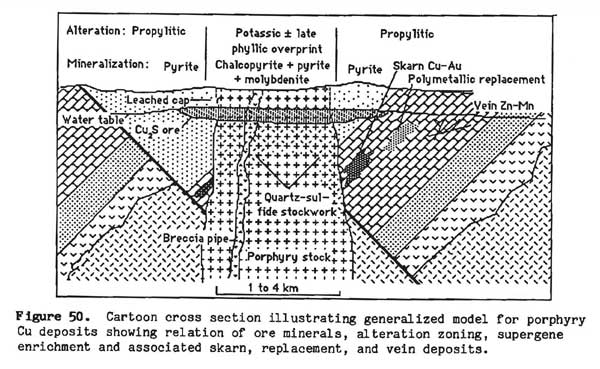
From Cox, (1986) US Geological Survey Bulletin 1693

Characteristics of porphyry copper deposits include:

- The orebodies are associated with multiple intrusions and dikes of diorite to quartz monzonite composition with porphyritic textures.
- Breccia zones with angular or locally rounded fragments are commonly associated with the intrusives. The sulfide mineralization typically occurs between or within fragments. These breccia zones are typically hydrothermal in nature, and may be manifested as pebble dikes.
- The deposits typically have an outer epidote – chlorite mineral alteration zone.
- A quartz – sericite alteration zone typically occurs closer to the center and may overprint.
- A central potassic zone of secondary biotite and orthoclase alteration is commonly associated with most of the ore.
- Fractures are often filled or coated by sulfides, or by quartz veins with sulfides. Closely spaced fractures of several orientations are usually associated with the highest grade ore.
- The upper portions of porphyry copper deposits may be subjected to supergene enrichment. This involves the metals in the upper portion being dissolved and carried down to below the water table, where they precipitate.

Porphyry copper deposits are typically mined by open-pit methods.

== Notable examples ==
=== Russia ===
- Tominskoe, Ural
- Mikheevskoe, Ural
- Salavatskoe, Ural

=== Mexico ===
- Cananea
- La Caridad
- Santo Tomas

=== Canada ===
- Highland Valley
- Gibraltar Mine

=== Chile ===
- Cerro Colorado
- Chuquicamata
- Collahuasi
- Escondida
- El Abra
- El Salvador
- El Teniente
- Los Pelambres
- Radomiro Tomić

=== Peru ===
- Toquepala
- Cerro Verde, southeast of the city of Arequipa

=== United States ===
- Ajo, Arizona
- Bagdad, Arizona
- Berkeley Pit, Butte, Montana
- Bingham Canyon Mine, Utah
- Lavender Pit, Bisbee, Arizona
- Morenci, Arizona
- Pebble Mine, Alaska
- Safford Mine, Safford, Arizona
- San Manuel, Arizona
- Sierrita, Arizona
- Resolution Copper, Superior, Arizona
- El Chino, Santa Rita, New Mexico
- Ely, Nevada
- Ray Mine, Arizona

=== Indonesia ===
- Batu Hijau, Sumbawa
- Grasberg, West Papua at >3 billion tonnes at 1 ppm Au, is one of the world's largest and richest porphyry deposits of any type
- Tujuh Bukit, Java, still under exploration, but likely to be bigger than Batu Hijau
- Sungai Mak and Cabang Kiri, Gorontalo, at 292 million tonnes at 0.50 ppm gold and 0.47% copper

=== Australia ===
- Cadia-Ridgeway Mine, New South Wales, copper-gold deposit mined by open pit and block caving.
- Northparkes copper porphyry deposit, New South Wales, with 63 million tonnes at 1.1% Cu and 0.5 ppm Au.

=== Papua New Guinea ===
- Ok Tedi
- Panguna/Bougainville Copper
- Wafi-Golpu project/Wafi-Golpu mine

=== Other ===
- Coclesito, Panama
- Majdanpek mine, Serbia
- Oyu Tolgoi is one of the world's largest and richest Cu porphyry deposits, Mongolia
- La Caridad, Sonora, Mexico
- Dizon, Philippines
- Saindak Copper Gold Project, Pakistan
- Waisoi mine, Fiji

== Porphyry-type ore deposits for other metals ==
Copper is not the only metal that occurs in porphyry deposits. There are also porphyry ore deposits mined primarily for molybdenum, many of which contain very little copper. Examples of porphyry molybdenum deposits are the Climax, Urad, Mt. Emmons, and Henderson deposits in central Colorado; the White Pine and Pine Grove deposits in Utah; the Questa deposit in northern New Mexico; and Endako in British Columbia.

The US Geological Survey has classed the Chorolque and Catavi tin deposits in Bolivia as porphyry tin deposits.

Some porphyry copper deposits in oceanic crust environments, such as those in the Philippines, Indonesia, and Papua New Guinea, are sufficiently rich in gold that they are called copper-gold porphyry deposits.
