= Magnesite =

Mineral composed of magnesium carbonate

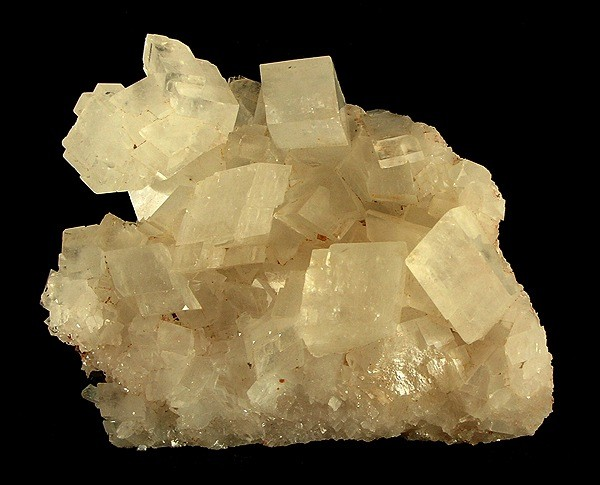
- Magnesite crystals from Brazil (11.4 × 9.2 × 3.6 cm)

General
- Category: Carbonate mineral
- Formula: MgCO_{3}
- IMA symbol: Mgs
- Strunz classification: 5.AB.05
- Crystal system: Trigonal
- Crystal class: Hexagonal scalenohedral (3̅m); H-M symbol: (3̅ 2/m)
- Space group: R3̅c

Identification
- Color: Colorless, white, pale yellow, pale brown, faintly pink, lilac-rose
- Crystal habit: Usually massive, rarely as rhombohedrons or hexagonal prisms
- Cleavage: [101̅1] perfect
- Fracture: Conchoidal
- Tenacity: Brittle
- Mohs scale hardness: 3.5–4.5
- Luster: Vitreous
- Streak: white
- Diaphaneity: Transparent to translucent
- Specific gravity: 3.0–3.2
- Optical properties: Uniaxial (−)
- Refractive index: n_{ω}=1.508 – 1.510 n_{ε}=1.700
- Birefringence: 0.191
- Fusibility: infusible
- Solubility: Effervesces in hot HCl
- Other characteristics: May exhibit pale green to pale blue fluorescence and phosphorescence under UV; triboluminescent

Magnesite is a mineral with the chemical formula MgCO_{3} (magnesium carbonate). Iron, manganese, cobalt, and nickel may occur as admixtures, but only in small amounts. Magnesite occurs naturally in both cryptocrystalline and crystalline forms depending on the conditions of formation.

Magnesite is used in the production of magnesium oxide for the refractory lining of kilns and furnaces, as well as artistically in jewelry and sculpture. Since it may be formed by carbonation of magnesium serpentine, there have also been efforts to use magnesite for carbon sequestration.

== Occurrence ==
Magnesite occurs as veins in and an alteration product of ultramafic rocks, serpentinite and other magnesium rich rock types in both contact and regional metamorphic terrains. These magnesites are often cryptocrystalline and contain silica in the form of opal or chert.

Magnesite is also present within the regolith above ultramafic rocks as a secondary carbonate within soil and subsoil, where it is deposited as a consequence of dissolution of magnesium-bearing minerals by carbon dioxide in groundwaters.

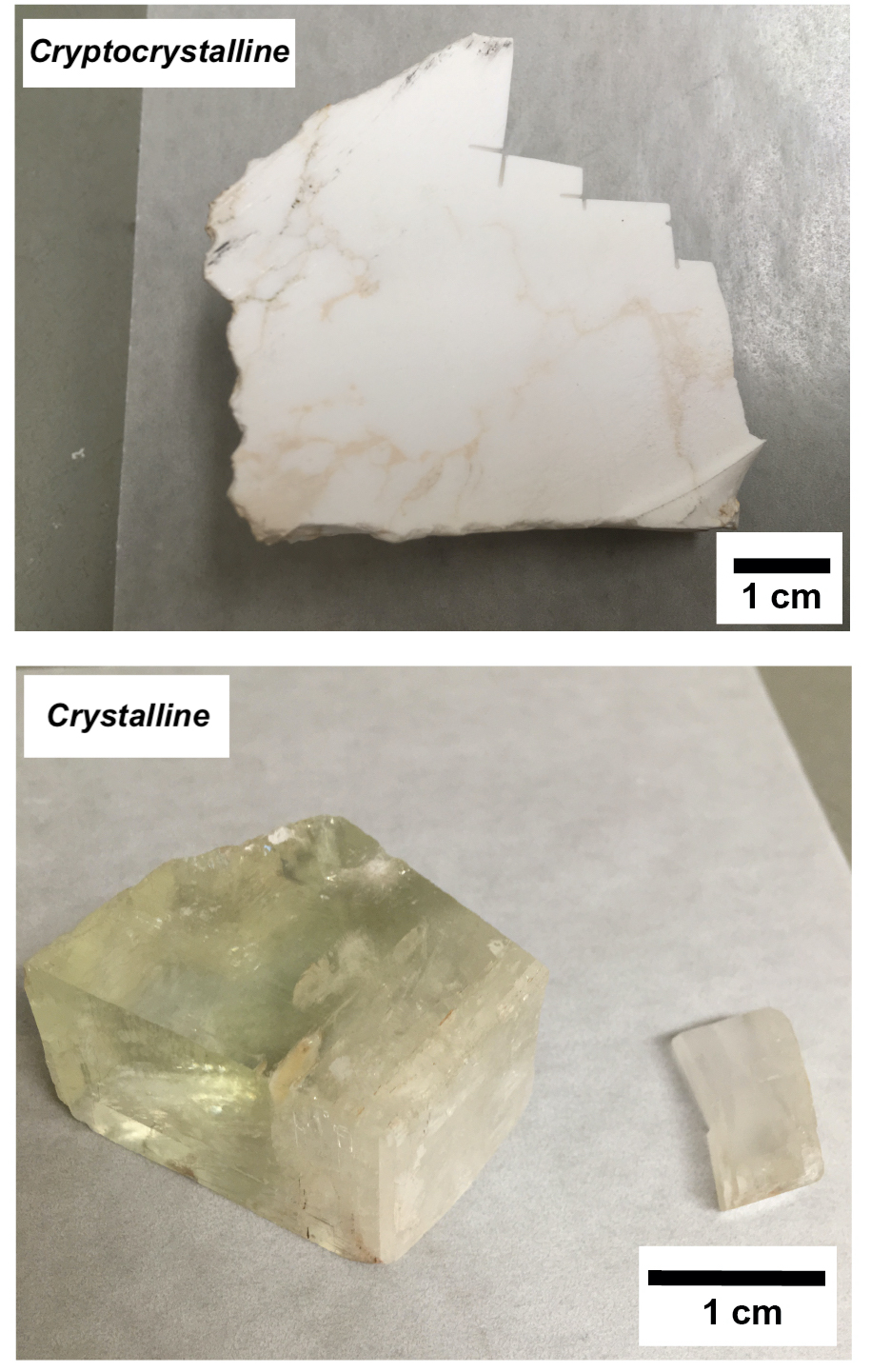
Difference between cryptocrystalline and crystalline magnesite.

Crystalline and cryptocrystalline magnesites have very different mineral structures. While crystalline magnesite has a well developed crystal structure, the cryptocrystalline magnesite is amorphous- mostly aggregate of fine grains.

== Formation ==
Magnesite can be formed via talc carbonate metasomatism of peridotite and other ultramafic rocks. Magnesite is formed via carbonation of olivine in the presence of water and carbon dioxide at elevated temperatures and high pressures typical of the greenschist facies.

Magnesite can also be formed via the carbonation of magnesium serpentine (lizardite) via the following reaction:

2 Mg_{3}Si_{2}O_{5}(OH)_{4} + 3 CO_{2} → Mg_{3}Si_{4}O_{10}(OH)_{2} + 3 MgCO_{3} + 3 H_{2}O

However, when performing this reaction in the laboratory, the trihydrated form of magnesium carbonate (nesquehonite) will form at room temperature. This very observation led to the postulation of a "dehydration barrier" being involved in the low-temperature formation of anhydrous magnesium carbonate. Laboratory experiments with formamide, a liquid resembling water, have shown how no such dehydration barrier can be involved. The fundamental difficulty to nucleate anhydrous magnesium carbonate remains when using this non-aqueous solution. Not cation dehydration, but rather the spatial configuration of carbonate anions creates the barrier in the low-temperature nucleation of magnesite.

Magnesite has been found in modern sediments, caves and soils. Its low-temperature (around 40 °C [104 °F]) formation is known to require alternations between precipitation and dissolution intervals. The low-temperature formation of magnesite might well be of significance toward large-scale carbon sequestration. A major step forward toward the industrial production of magnesite at atmospheric pressure and a temperature of 316 K was described by Vandeginste. In those experiments small additions of hydrochloric acid alternated periodically with additions of sodium carbonate solution. Also new in these experiments was the very short duration of only a few hours for the alternating dissolution and precipitation cycles.

Magnesite was detected in meteorite ALH84001 and on planet Mars itself. Magnesite was identified on Mars using infrared spectroscopy from satellite orbit. Near Jezero Crater, Mg-carbonates have been detected and reported to have formed in lacustrine environment prevailing there. Controversy still exists over the temperature of formation of these carbonates. Low-temperature formation has been suggested for the magnesite from the Mars-derived ALH84001 meteorite.

Magnesium-rich olivine (forsterite) favors production of magnesite from peridotite. Iron-rich olivine (fayalite) favors production of magnetite-magnesite-silica compositions.

Magnesite can also be formed by way of metasomatism in skarn deposits, in dolomitic limestones, associated with wollastonite, periclase, and talc.

Resistant to high temperature and able to withstand high pressure, magnesite has been proposed to be one of the major carbonate bearing phase in Earth's mantle and possible carriers for deep carbon reservoirs. For similar reason, it is found in metamorphosed peridotite rocks in Central Alps, Switzerland and high pressure eclogitic rocks from Tianshan, China.

Magnesite can also precipitate in lakes in presence of bacteria either as hydrous Mg-carbonates or magnesite.

=== Isotopic evidence ===
Isotopic structure of CO_{2} and MgCO_{3} illustrating singly and doubly substituted species of CO_{2}.

Clumped isotopes have been used in interpreting conditions of magnesite formation and the isotopic composition of the precipitating fluid. Within ultramafic complexes, magnesites are found within veins and stockworks in cryptocrystalline form as well as within carbonated peridotite units in crystalline form. These cryptocrystalline forms are mostly variably weathered and yield low temperature of formation. On the other hand, coarse magnesites yield very high temperature indicating hydrothermal origin. It is speculated that coarse high temperature magnesites are formed from mantle derived fluids whereas cryptocrystalline ones are precipitated by circulating meteoric water, taking up carbon from dissolved inorganic carbon pool, soil carbon and affected by disequilibrium isotope effects.

Magnesites forming in lakes and playa settings are in general enriched in heavy isotopes of C and O because of evaporation and CO_{2} degassing. This reflects in the clumped isotope derived temperature being very low. These are affected by pH effect, biological activity as well as kinetic isotope effect associated with degassing. Magnesite forms as surface moulds in such conditions but more generally occur as hydrous Mg-carbonates since their precipitation is kinetically favored. Most of the times, they derive C from DIC or nearby ultramafic complexes (e.g., Altin Playa, British Columbia, Canada).

Magnesites in metamorphic rocks, on the other hand, indicate very high temperature of formation. Isotopic composition of parental fluid is also heavy- generally metamorphic fluids. This has been verified by fluid inclusion derived temperature as well as traditional O isotope thermometry involving co-precipitating quartz-magnesite.

Often, magnesite records lower clumped isotope temperature than associated dolomite, calcite. The reason might be that calcite, dolomite form earlier at higher temperature (from mantle like fluids) which increases Mg/Ca ratio in the fluid sufficiently so as to precipitate magnesite. As this happens with increasing time, fluid cools, evolves by mixing with other fluids and when it forms magnesite, it decreases its temperature. So the presence of associated carbonates have a control on magnesite isotopic composition.

Origin of Martian carbonates can be deconvolved with the application of clumped isotope. Source of the CO_{2}, climatic-hydrologic conditions on Mars could be assessed from these rocks. Recent study has shown (implementing clumped isotope thermometry) that carbonates in ALH84001 indicate formation at low temperature evaporative condition from subsurface water and derivation of CO_{2} from Martian atmosphere.

== Uses ==
=== Refractory material ===
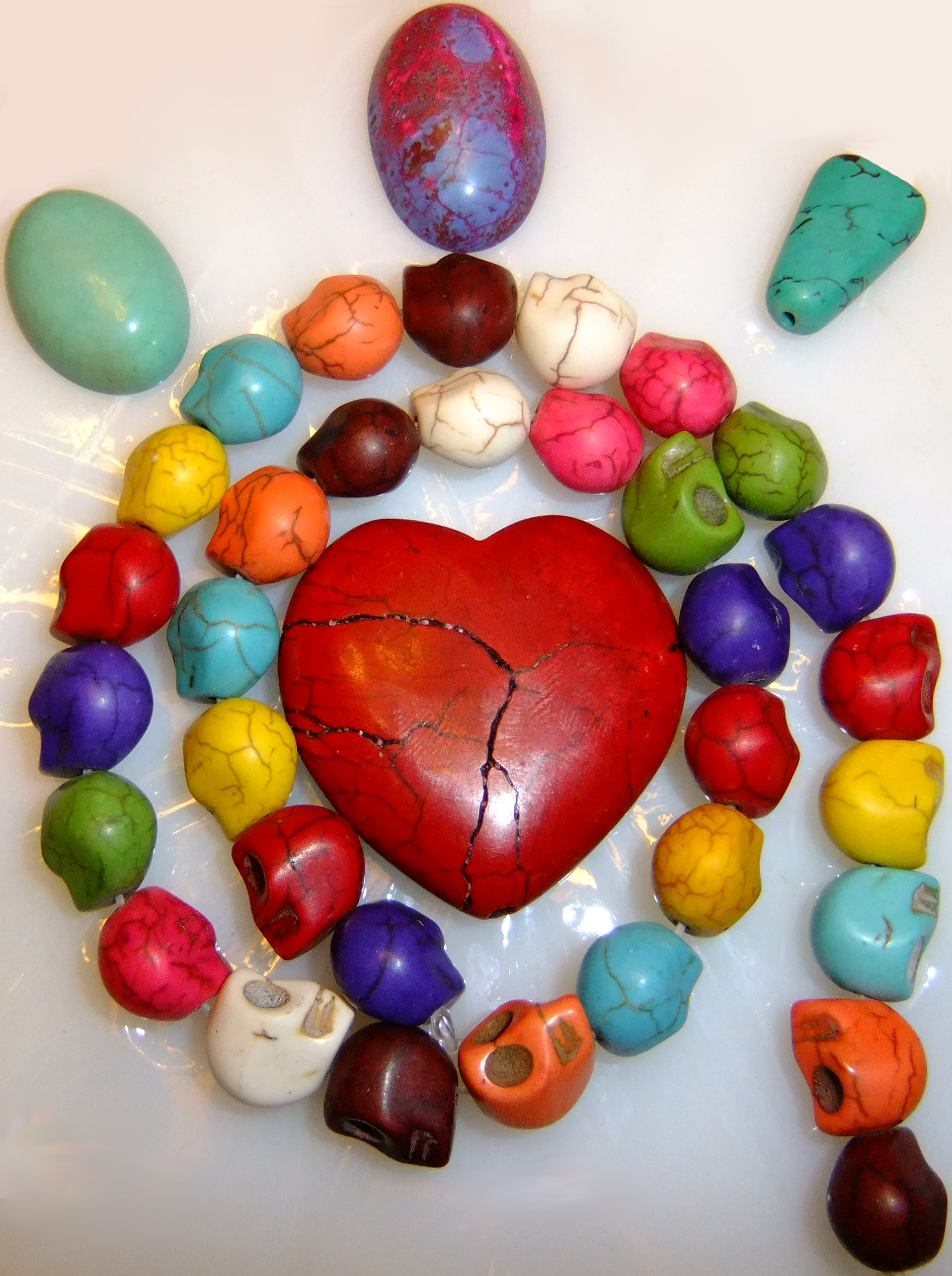
Polished and Dyed magnesite beads

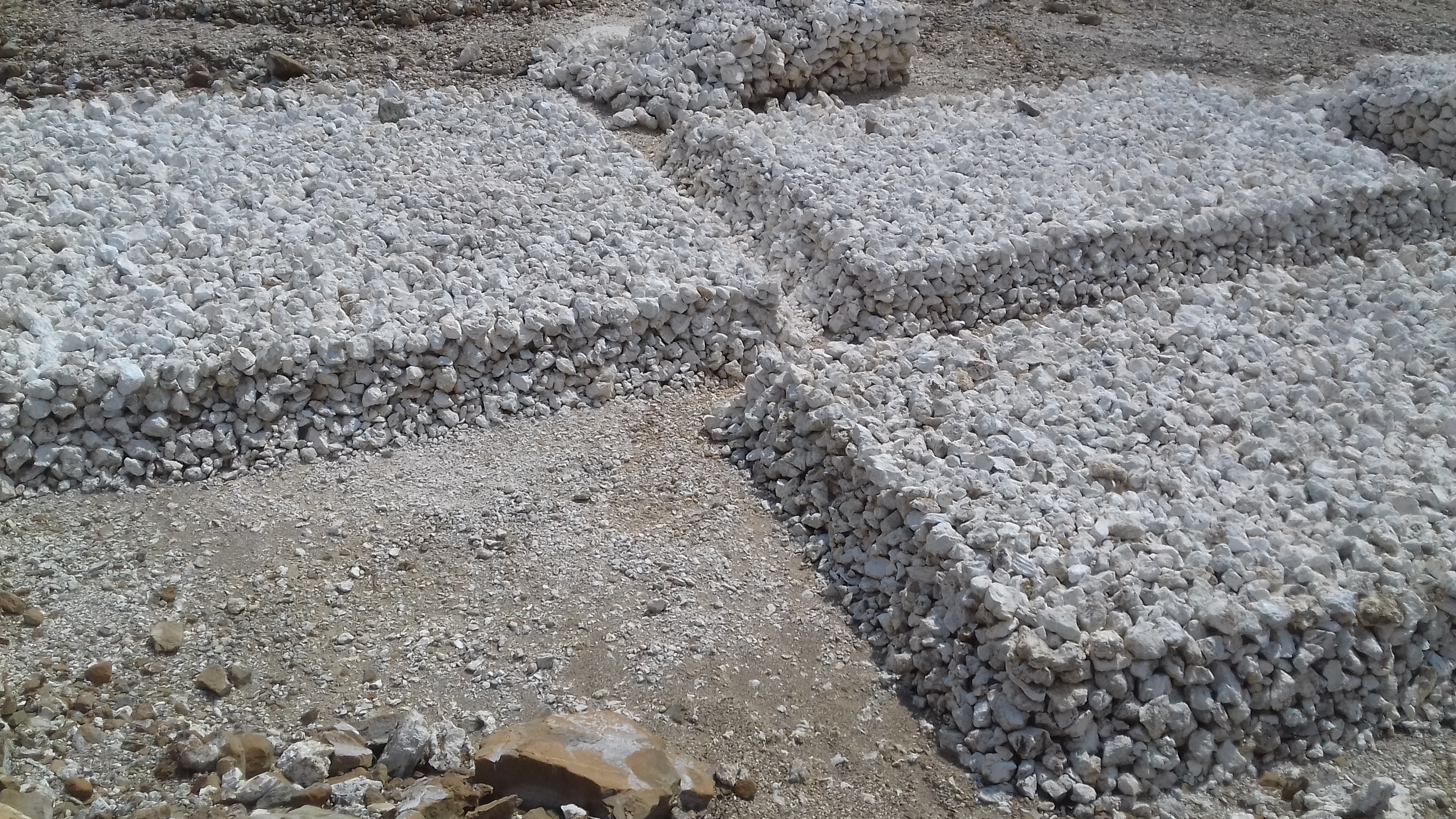
Magnesite of Salem

Similar to the production of lime, magnesite can be burned in the presence of charcoal to produce MgO, which, in the form of a mineral, is known as periclase. Large quantities of magnesite are burnt to make magnesium oxide: an important refractory (heat-resistant) material used as a lining in blast furnaces, kilns and incinerators.

Calcination temperatures determine the reactivity of resulting oxide products and the classifications of light burnt and dead burnt refer to the surface area and resulting reactivity of the product (this is typically determined by an industry metric of the iodine number).

'Light burnt' product generally refers to calcination commencing at 450 °C and proceeding to an upper limit of 900 °C – which results in good surface area and reactivity.

Above 900 °C, the material loses its reactive crystalline structure and reverts to the chemically inert 'dead-burnt' product- which is preferred for use in refractory materials such as furnace linings.

In fire assay, magnesite cupels can be used for cupellation, as the magnesite cupel will resist the high temperatures involved.

=== Other uses ===
Magnesite can also be used as a binder in flooring material (magnesite screed). Furthermore, it is being used as a catalyst and filler in the production of synthetic rubber and in the preparation of magnesium chemicals and fertilizers.

Research is proceeding to evaluate the practicality of sequestering the greenhouse gas carbon dioxide in magnesite on a large scale. This has focused on peridotites from ophiolites (obducted mantle rocks on crust) where magnesite can be created by letting carbon dioxide react with these rocks. Some progress has been made in ophiolites from Oman. But the major problem is that these artificial processes require sufficient porosity-permeability so that the fluids can flow but this is hardly the case in peridotites.

=== Artworks ===
Magnesite can be cut, drilled, and polished to form beads that are used in jewelry-making. Magnesite beads can be dyed into a broad spectrum of bold colors, including a light blue color that mimics the appearance of turquoise.

The Japanese-American artist Isamu Noguchi used magnesite as a sculptural material for some of his artworks.

== Occupational safety and health ==
People can be exposed to magnesite in the workplace by inhaling it, skin contact, and eye contact.

=== United States ===
The Occupational Safety and Health Administration (OSHA) has set the legal limit (permissible exposure limit) for magnesite exposure in the workplace as 15 mg/m^{3} total exposure and 5 mg/m^{3} respiratory exposure over an 8-hour workday. The National Institute for Occupational Safety and Health (NIOSH) has set a recommended exposure limit (REL) of 10 mg/m^{3} total exposure and 5 mg/m^{3} respiratory exposure over an 8-hour workday.
