= Nili Fossae =

Group of large, concentric grabens on Mars,

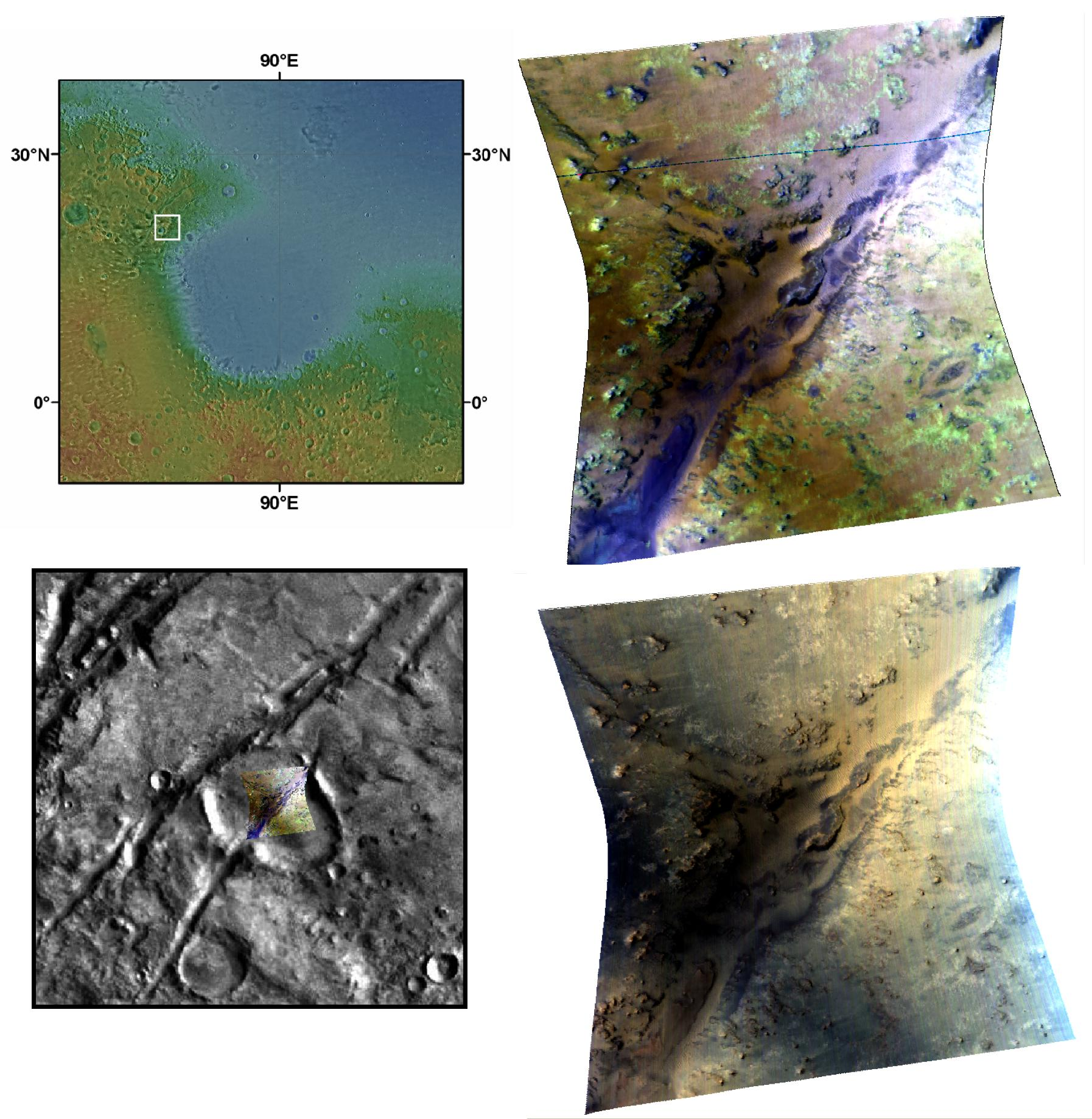
- Nili Fossae as seen by CRISM. Top left: location of observation. Bottom left: context of observation. Top right: yellow-brown areas denote olivine, bright green areas denote phyllosilicates and purple areas pyroxene. Bottom right: approximate true-color view of the target area.
- Coordinates: 22.57°N 76.8°E
- Length: 667.0

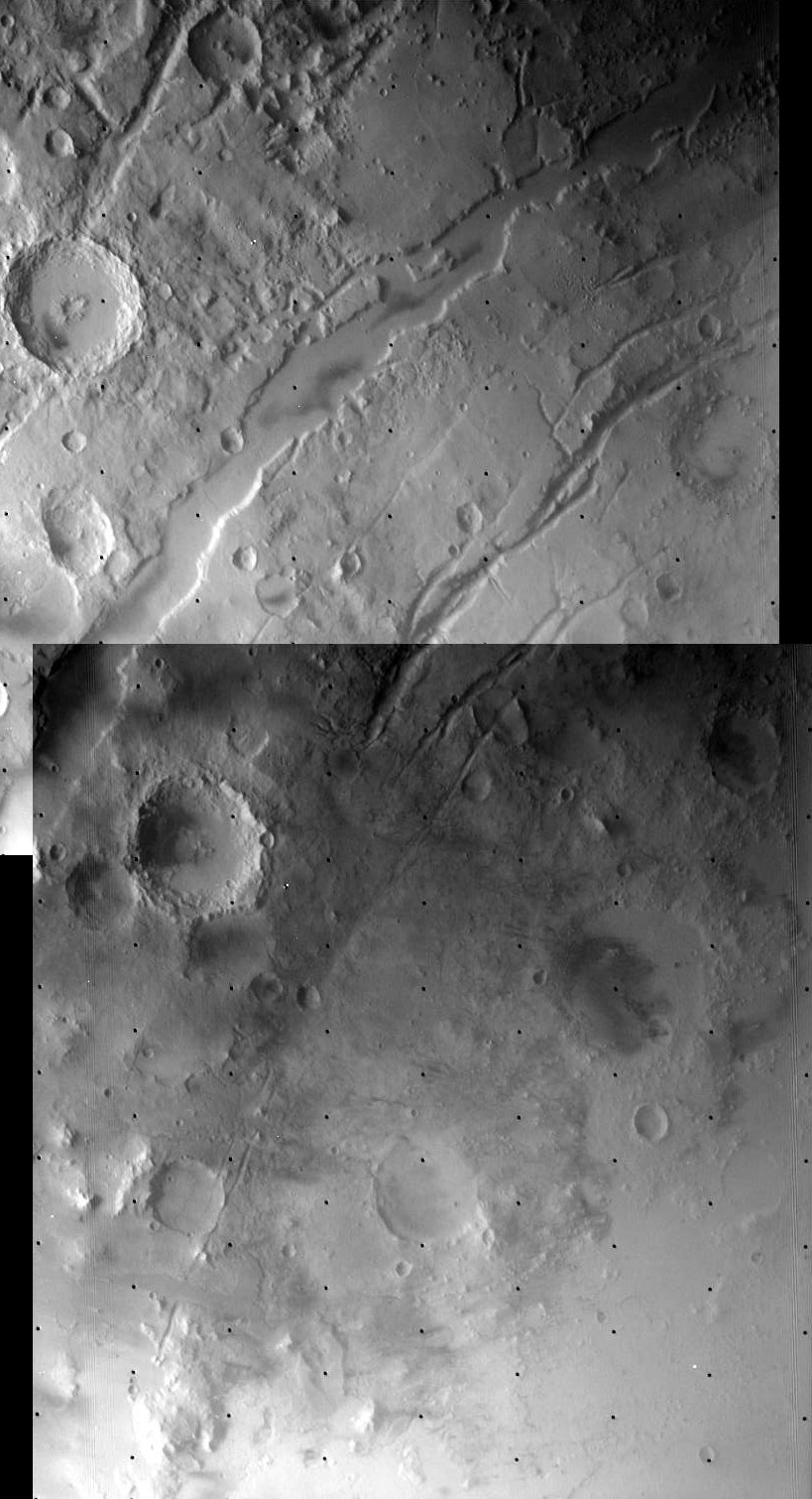
Viking Orbiter 1 mosaic of Nili Fossae

Nili Fossae is a group of large, concentric grabens on Mars, in the Syrtis Major quadrangle. They have been eroded and partly filled in by sediments and clay-rich ejecta from a nearby giant impact crater, the Isidis basin. It is at approximately 22°N, 75°E, and has an elevation of −0.6 km (−0.37 mi).

A large exposure of olivine is in Nili Fossae. In December 2008, NASA's Mars Reconnaissance Orbiter found that rocks at Nili Fossae contain carbonate minerals, a geologically significant discovery. Other minerals found by MRO are aluminum smectite, iron/magnesium smecite, hydrated silica, kaolinite group minerals, and iron oxides. NASA scientists discovered that Nili Fossae is the source of plumes of methane, raising the question of whether this source originates from biological sources.

Researchers in July 2010 suggested that carbonate bearing rocks found in the Nili Fossae region of Mars are made up of hydrothermally altered ultramafic rocks. Consequently, hydrothermal activity would have provided sufficient energy for biological activity. Evidence of living organisms could have been preserved.

Nili Fossae trough is thought to have resulted from the impact that formed the nearby Isidis basin.

Nili Fossae was on the list of potential landing sites of the Mars Science Laboratory, arriving in 2012, but was dropped before the final four sites were determined. Although not among the last finalists, in September 2015 it was selected as a potential landing site for the Mars 2020 rover, which will use the same design as Curiosity, but with a different payload focused on astrobiology. Nili Fossae is also considered ideal for future human exploration, with the prominent Gavin Crater at 21.43°N, 76.93°E considered the most likely landing zone in Nili Fossae.

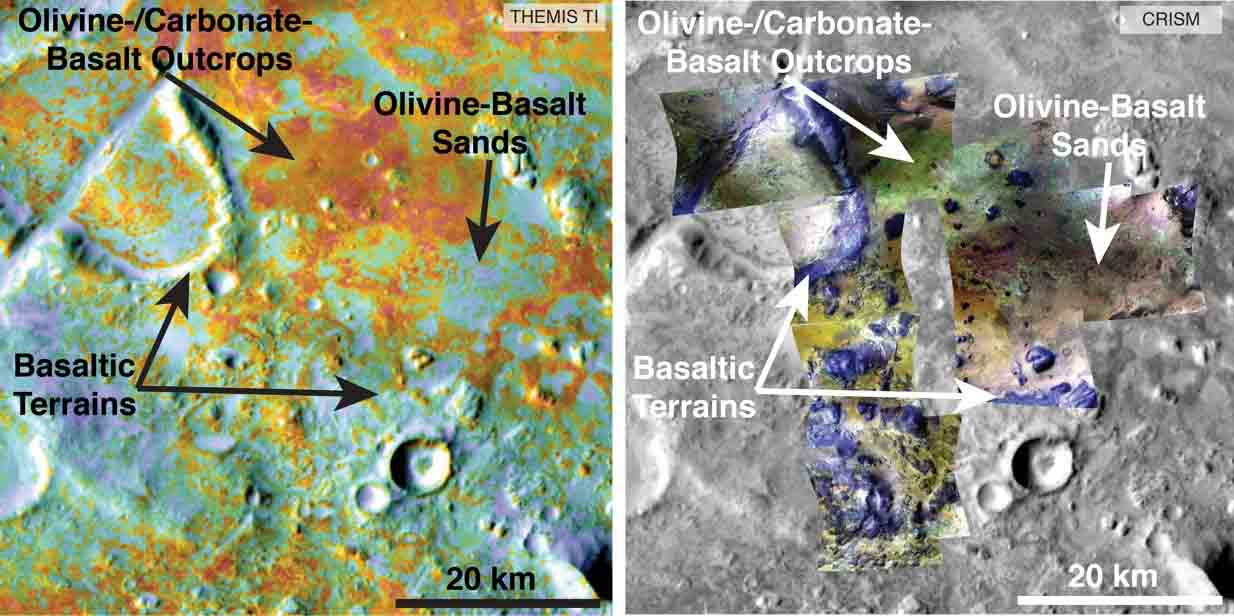
Estimating carbon in the Nili Fossae plains region of Mars from orbiters.

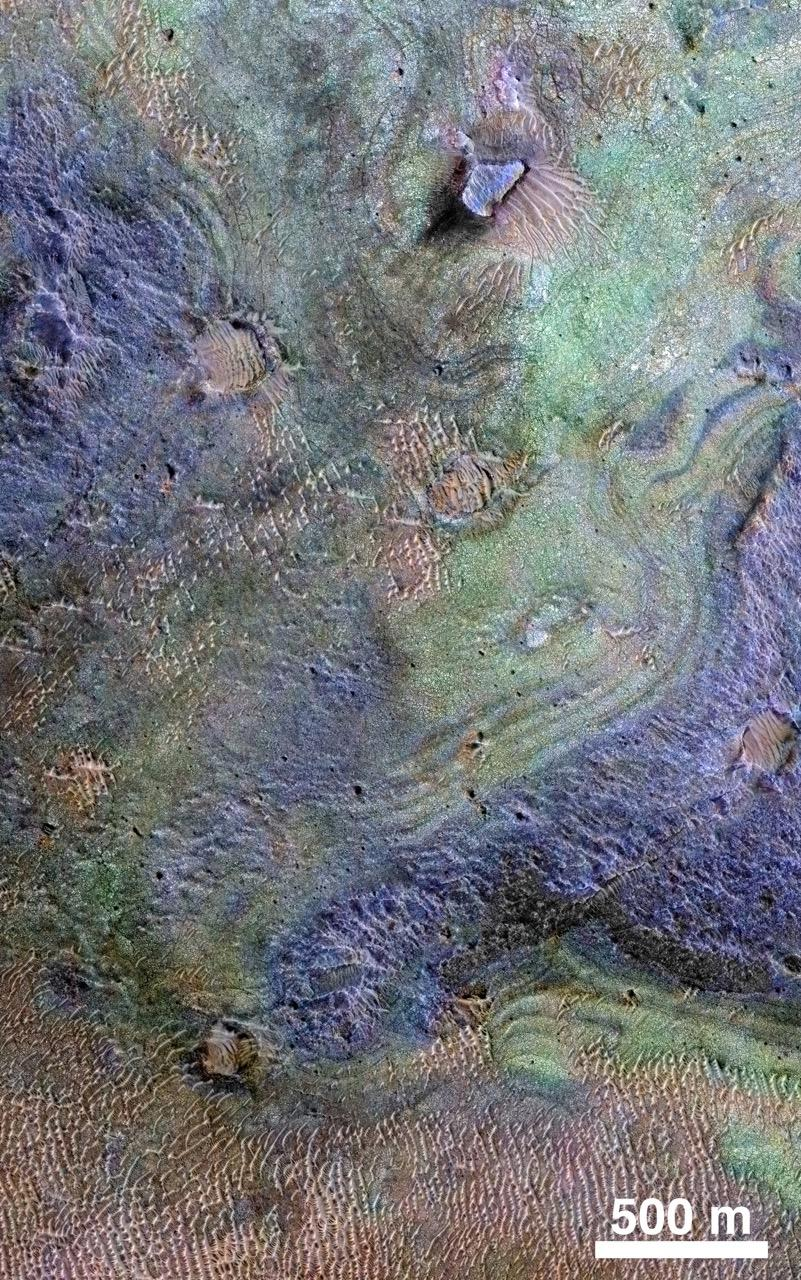
Nili Fossae – largest known carbonate deposit on Mars.

Nili Fossae Trough was one of seven finalists for the MSL landing site:

- Eberswalde Crater
- Gale Crater
- Holden Crater
- Mawrth Vallis
- Miyamoto Crater
- Nili Fossae Trough
- Southern Meridiani
