= Waisoi mine =

Copper mine in Namosi, Fiji

Coordinates: 18°0′20.34″S 178°9′19.78″E

- Interactive map of Waisoi mine
- Location: Namosi Province, Fiji
- Products: Copper
- Company: Namosi Joint Venture (Newcrest Mining 70%, Mitsubishi Materials 27%, Nittetsu Mining Company 2%)

The Waisoi mine was a proposed copper mine located on the island of Viti Levu in Namosi Province, Fiji. Multiple companies explored the feasibility of mining in the area, culminating with Namosi Joint Venture, in the hopes of exploiting one of the largest copper reserves in Fiji and the world. The mine was simultaneously controversial for potential environmental damage. In 2026, Namosi Joint Venture withdrew from the mine project.

== Geology ==
The copper deposit at Waisoi is a porphyry copper deposit. The Waisoi copper deposits are divided into two distinct deposits, Waisoi East which is characterized by exposed quartz porphyry and Waisoi West which is characterized by diorite porphyry. Copper mineralization at both deposits likely occurred in a high-sulfidation environment.

== History ==
Mineral exploration in the Namosi region dates back to 1968. Copper deposits on the island of Vitu Levu were identified in the 1970s via stream sediment geochemistry. Exploration diamond drilling probed the sites of Waisoi, Waivaka, and Wainabama. While soil and pit geochemistry was useful in siting drill holes at Waivaka and moderately useful at Wainabama, it was of little value at the principal prospect of Waisoi due to superficial cover by alluvium and mudflow.

In 1997, Royal Oak Mines struck a deal with Placer Pacific Namosi, a subsidiary of Placer Dome, to acquire the Waisoi site in exchange for a 5% net profits interest to a maximum of A$15,000,000. Royal Oak planned to spend US$3,000,000 to bring the site to the feasibility stage. The Fijian government consented to the transfer, simultaneously granting Royal Oak a special prospecting license over western Kadavu Island.

In 2001, the Nittetsu Mining Company proposed to mine the Coral Coast and Waisoi Valley, which would have produced a projected 100,000 short tons (91,000 t) of tailings per day and would have required dumping waste into the Navua River or the Beqa Lagoon. The project was vehemently opposed by local residents and by the Fiji Tourism Forum.

Nittetsu formed a joint venture with other companies in order to exploit the Waisoi deposits. In 2012, the Fijian government granted a special prospecting lease in the Namosi region to the joint venture, a collaboration between three corporations: Newcrest Mining (with a 70% stake), Mitsubishi Materials (28%), and Nittetsu Mining (2%). Namosi Joint Venture dedicated itself to exploring for mineral resources in an approximately 724 square kilometer area of Namosi and Naitasiri Province, in particular at Waisoi. In 2014, company spokesman Greg Morris stated that Namosi Joint Venture would work with the government, landowners, and villages to deliver sustainable benefits to Fiji.

=== Opposition and closure ===
Local environmentalist groups objected to the Waisoi mine and its potential for pollution. When Namosi Joint Venture's mineral exploration license came due for renewal in 2023, local civil society group Lomani Au Maroroi Au (LAMA) organized in opposition. LAMA presented a list of objections to the Parliament of Fiji on August 9, the International Day of the World's Indigenous People; one opposition MP and no government MPs attended the event.

The Namosi Joint Venture's prospecting license expired in January 2026. The Mataqali Nabukebuke Namosi Koro Trust accused the Namosi Joint Venture of trespassing for not immediately vacating the site. In April 2026, Namosi Joint Venture confirmed its withdrawal from Namosi Province. The company presented a tabua to the local community and began clearing its base camp at Waisoi.
