= Wafi-Golpu mine =

Gold mine in Morobe, Papua New Guinea

Coordinates: 6.9679°S 146.4248°E

- Interactive map of Wafi-Golpu mine
- Location: Morobe Province, Papua New Guinea
- Products: Gold

The Wafi-Golpu mine is one of the largest gold mines in Papua New Guinea and in the world. The mine is located in the east of the country in Morobe Province. The mine has estimated reserves of 20 million oz of gold.

== History ==
In the early 1980s, the Wafi A gold deposit was discovered by CRA Exploration Pty Ltd, now part of Rio Tinto, during a nationwide search for porphyry copper deposits. In 1990, Elders Resources and CRA Exploration first explored the Golpu porphyry copper-gold deposit. However, both companies later withdrew from the project. Between 1994 and 2003, the project had several owners, including Australian company Abelle Limited and the American company Aurora Gold. In 2003, South African company Harmony Gold acquired Abelle and thereby gained control of the project. In 2008, Newcrest acquired a stake in the project for US$525 million and obtained a 50% interest in the joint venture in mid-2009.

== Location ==
The deposit is located on the western flank of the Timini Range, about 4 km from the broad valleys of the Watut River and Markham River. The project can be reached via the paved Timini–Demakwa road and a 38 km unpaved road.

== Resources ==
The deposit contains 870 million tonnes of mineralized rock, with copper resources of 8.9 million tonnes and gold resources of 19.3 million troy ounces. The mining area could contain the world's third-largest gold and copper reserves, after the Grasberg mine in Western New Guinea, Indonesia, and the Oyu Tolgoi project in southern Mongolia.

== Development ==
Annual production was estimated at between 600,000 and 800,000 ounces of gold and between 300,000 and 500,000 tonnes of copper. A pre-feasibility study was expected to be completed in early 2012. It included the estimated costs of constructing a new road, establishing a mining camp and associated infrastructure, and beginning work on access to the underground exploration area. The deposit was not expected to begin production before 2017.
