= Mineralogy of Mars =

The mineralogy of Mars is the chemical composition of rocks and soil that encompass the surface of Mars. Various orbital crafts have used spectroscopic methods to identify the signature of some minerals. The planetary landers performed concrete chemical analysis of the soil in rocks to further identify and confirm the presence of other minerals. The only samples of Martian rocks that are on Earth are in the form of meteorites. The elemental and atmospheric composition along with planetary conditions is essential in knowing what minerals can be formed from these base parts.

== Mineral composition ==
The surface geology of Mars is somewhere between the basalt or andesite rocks on Earth. This led to the formation of minerals similar to what is found on Earth. The presence of iron oxide gives the surface the “rust” color that is associated with Mars, the Red Planet. The presence of perchlorate, in high percentages, forms highly saline soils, which could produce liquid water. Chemical alteration of Martian rocks into carbonate and phyllosilicate minerals occurred earlier in Mars history when water was present in large quantities. Orbital instruments and Landers not only identified new minerals but in some cases also confirmed the presence of minerals detected by the others.

Phyllosilicates

- Kaolinite (Al_{2}Si_{2}O_{5}(OH)_{4}}
- Montmorillonite ((Na,Ca)_{0.33}(Al,Mg)_{2}(Si_{4}O_{10})(OH)_{2}·nH_{2}O)
- Mica (X_{2}Y_{4–6}Z_{8}O_{20}(OH,F)_{4})
- Serpentine ((Mg,Fe)_{3}Si_{2}O_{5}(OH)_{4})

Felsic minerals

- Quartz (SiO_{2})
- Feldspar (KAlSi_{3}O_{8} ^{−} NaAlSi_{3}O_{8} ^{−} CaAl_{2}Si_{2}O_{8})
- Maskelynite

Salts

- Gypsum (CaSO_{4}·2H_{2}O)
- Perchlorate (ClO^{4−})

Carbonates (Ca rich)

- Ikaite (CaCO_{3}·6H_{2}O)
- Aragonite (CaCO_{3})
- Ankerite (Ca(Fe,Mg,Mn)(CO_{3})_{2})

Sulfates (Ca/Mg rich)

- Jarosite (KFe^{(III)}_{3}(OH)_{6}(SO_{4})_{2})
- Other undetermined

Mafic minerals

- Olivine (Mg,Fe)_{2}SiO_{4})
- Pyroxene (XY(Si,Al)_{2}O_{6})
- Augite ((Ca,Na)(Mg,Fe,Al)(Si,Al)_{2}O_{6})
- Pigeonite ((Ca,Mg,Fe)(Mg,Fe)Si_{2}O_{6})
- Clinopyroxene

Iron oxides

- Hematite (Fe_{2}O_{3})
- Magnetite (Fe_{3}O_{4})
- Ilmenite (FeTiO_{3})

== Orbital instruments ==
Orbital crafts sent to Mars provided data on surface geology mostly through spectroscopy. This data is used to determine possible minerals on the surface, and the types of instruments Landers would need in order to narrow down those minerals.

Mars Global Surveyor

Launched in 1996, it used the Mars Orbiter Camera (MOC), Mars Orbital Laser Altimeter, and Thermal Emission Spectrometer to show layering on the surface, presence of surface ice, and the mineral hematite. The presence of ice over the surface is essential to understanding why certain water bearing minerals are on Mars.

Mars Odyssey

Launched in 2001, although it carried multiple instruments only Thermal Emission Imaging System was designed to look at minerals. This allowed it to detect the presence of quartz, olivine, and hematite.

Mars Express

Launched in 2003 the Visible and Infrared Mineralogical Mapping Spectrometer (OMEGA) observed montmorillonite and localized phyllosilicate minerals.

Mars Reconnaissance Orbiter

Launched in 2005 this orbiter carried multiple instruments which found the mineralogy to be dominated by mafic minerals such as olivine, mica, pyroxene and smectite clays such as kaolinite. The HiRISE was used in determining the landing site for the Phoenix Lander. Using the CTX (camera) and CRISM instruments it was able to find phyllosilicate minerals, carbonate minerals, and oxides. The SHARAD was used to detect carbonate dust layers.

== Landers ==
To date, the only method planetary scientists have used to carry out experiments on the Martian surface has been to send probes to it. The successful missions are able to carry out experiments that directly observe the composition of Martian soil and rocks. They are the key to verifying our observations of minerals, although currently they are limited to the uppermost area of the surface.

Mars Pathfinder

Mars Exploration Rover Mission

Launched in 2003 it contained two separate rovers the Spirit rover and the Opportunity rover.

Spirit One of its instruments the Mössbauer spectrometer (MIMOS II) was designed to look at the iron bearing minerals on mars. It is responsible for determining the presence of many specific iron oxides, which give the planet a red color.

Opportunity Using the Mini-TES it was able to detect the presence of some calcium and magnesium rich sulfate minerals. It also found feldspar, jarosite, pigeonite, clinopyroxene, and maskelynite along with detecting the presence of minerals found by the orbiters and other rovers.

Phoenix Lander

Most noted for landing in a polar region, it carries the WCL (Wet Chemistry Laboratory), which is a part of the MECA (Microscopy, Electrochemistry, and Conductivity Analyzer) instrument suite. It is responsible for identifying perchlorate salts, and various cations such as magnesium, sodium, calcium, and potassium. Along with TEGA it showed the presence of calcium carbonate, and minute traces of methane. Due to the analytical limits of MECA, the Phoenix was unable to determine the sulfur-based minerals detected by the Opportunity.

== See also ==
- Carbonates on Mars – Overview of the presence of carbonates on Mars
- Chloride-bearing deposits on Mars
- Composition of Mars – Branch of the geology of Mars
- Geography of Mars – Delineation and characterization of Martian regions
- List of rocks on Mars – Alphabetical list of named rocks and meteorites found on Mars
- Martian soil – Fine regolith found on the surface of Mars
- Ore resources on Mars – Ore deposits on Mars that may be useful to future colonists
