= Chloride-bearing deposits on Mars =

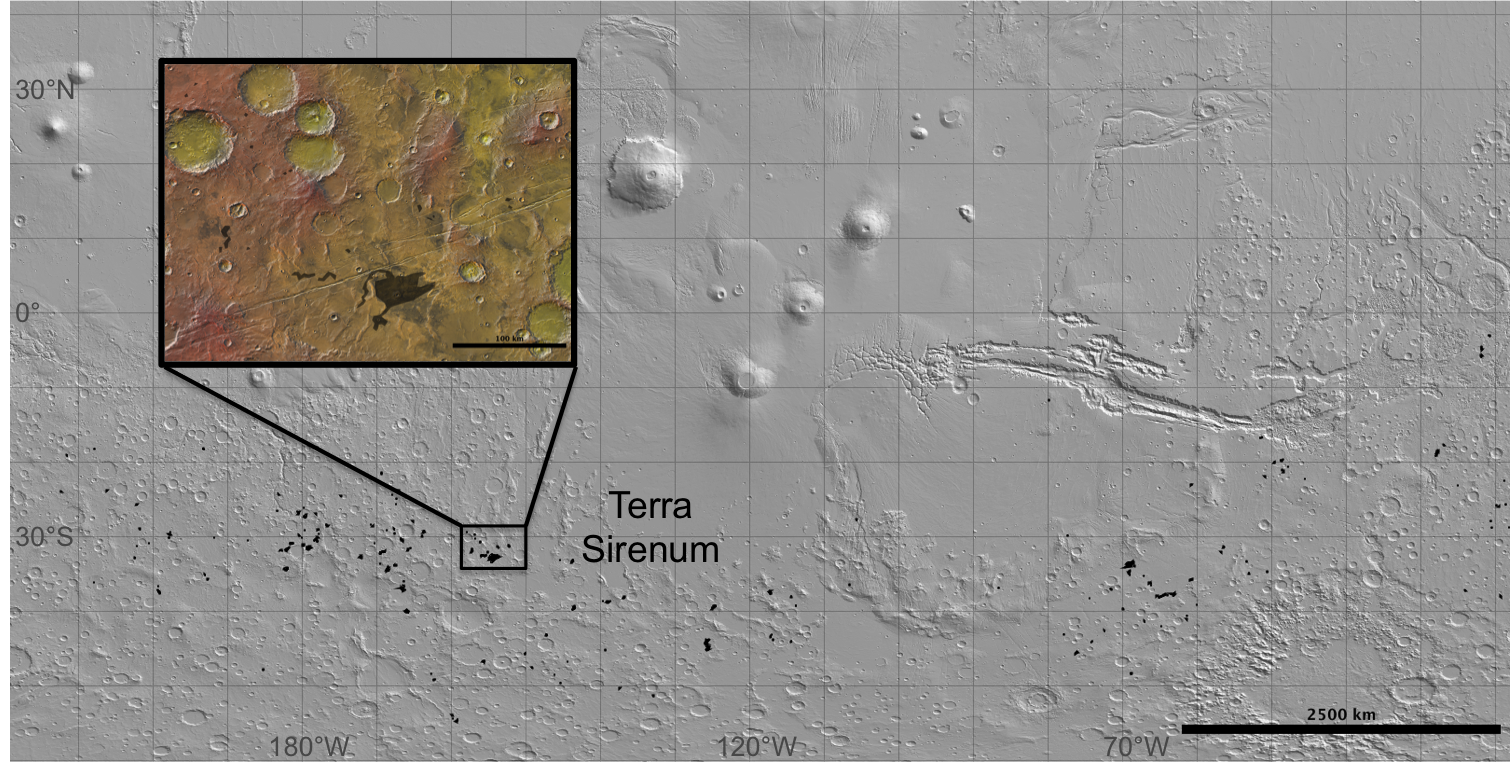
Locations of chloride-bearing deposits (black) overlain on a Mars Orbiter Laser Altimeter (MOLA) elevation map (grayscale). Inset is of a region in Terra Sirenum investigated by Davila et al. (2011). Color represents elevation as determined by MOLA (red is higher elevation, yellow is lower elevation).

Across the southern highlands of Mars, approximately 640 sites of chloride-bearing deposits have been identified using the Thermal Emission Imaging System (THEMIS). These isolated, irregularly shaped patches (approximate size range of 0.33 – 1300 km^{2}, with an average size of 24 km^{2}) have been dated to the older geologic periods on Mars: Noachian (4.5 – 3.5 billion years ago) and Hesperian (3.5 – 2.9 billion years ago) periods. On Earth, chlorides are known to form through aqueous processes. Similar processes are expected to be responsible for the formation of chloride deposits on Mars. The finding of these deposits is significant in that it provides further evidence for the presence of surface or subsurface water in ancient Mars.

== Importance of chlorides ==
Chlorides contain the anion Cl^{−} and are soluble in water, meaning they provide evidence of past aqueous processes, which helps to constrain the type of environment at a particular region. On Earth, two main processes form chlorides: efflorescence and precipitation. Whereas on Earth these minerals are formed in more alkaline environments, the minerals on Mars form from more acidic fluids and the processes are connected to basaltic weathering. The key similarity between the formation of chlorides on the two planets is the presence of water. This is important because water is essential to life on Earth, and therefore drives the search for evidence of life on other planets. Chlorides are of particular interest because of their potential to preserve a biological signature through chemical sedimentation. In addition, their presence throughout the entire southern hemisphere of Mars suggests their formation have been an important process to the early history of Mars.

== Methods for identification ==
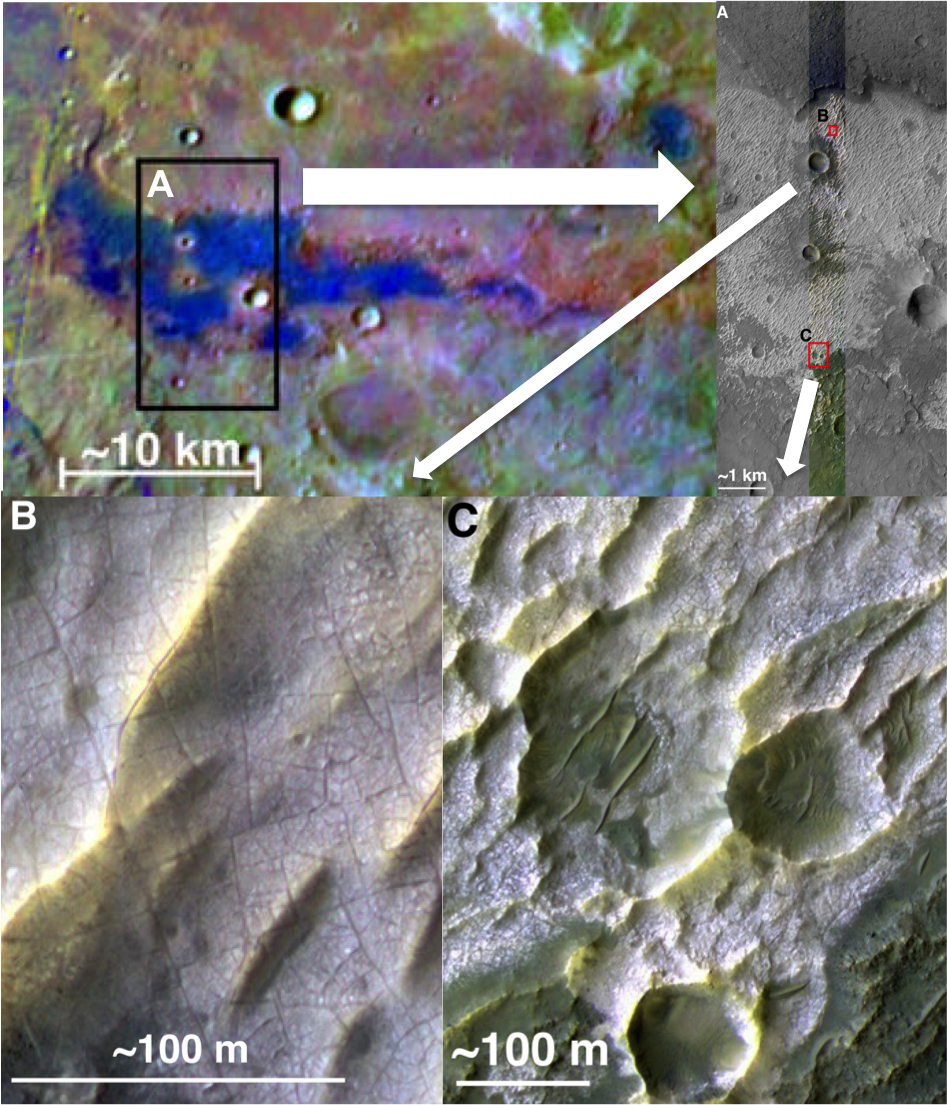
Upper Left) Chloride deposits shown in blue as observed by THEMIS in Terra Sirenum A) HiRISE image of black box in upper left B) HiRISE image showing the polygonal fractures (inset of Box B in Box A) C) HiRISE image showing the chloride deposits overlying degraded craters (inset of Box C in Box A)

The chloride salts were identified using THEMIS on board the 2001 Mars Odyssey orbiter. The spectrum acquired from THEMIS shows a featureless slope over the wavenumber range of ~672 to 1475 cm^{−1}. Few things describe this spectrally distinct feature, and thus has been concluded to be the result of chloride-bearing deposits. One such supporting terrestrial example is the identification of halite in Death Valley by instruments in the same wavelength as THEMIS. Further investigation of these deposits using the High Resolution Imaging Science Experiment (HiRISE) on the Mars Reconnaissance Orbiter (MRO) showed the features to be light-toned and irregularly shaped fractures overlying small, degraded craters. Spectra from the Compact Reconnaissance Imaging Spectrometer (CRISM) on MRO was also used for comparison in lab experiments to explain the featureless slope observed in the THEMIS data. Known minerals on Earth were tested to see if they reproduced the same distinct THEMIS spectra. Pyrite was determined to not be a possible match for the mineral deposits on Mars. Flood basalt mixtures containing halite reproduced the spectra in some instances, reinforcing the conclusion that this THEMIS spectra, and thus the deposits, are chloride. However, the most definitive evidence that these are in fact chloride deposits will come from in situ observations on the Martian surface.

== Terra Sirenum ==
Terra Sirenum is a region in the southern highlands of Mars (approximately at 38.8°S, 221°E), with a distinguishing feature of a higher brightness as compared to the typical background soils. It is of particular interest because it is the location of the largest regional occurrence of chlorides. One study has interpreted six regions of chloride deposits (10 – 50 km^{2}) in the lowest topographical levels of an inter-crater basin (300 – 400 km) as individual salt flats. Connecting channels between the salt flats provides evidence for a common origin, such as evaporation of water. Comparing these salt flats to ones observed on Earth, such as those in the Atacama Desert further supports the hypothesis of a formation due to evaporation. Using CRISM data, this study also observed phyllosilicates in the rims of craters and the surrounding ejecta to occur near the chlorides. Another study also observed phyllosilicates to be closely located to chlorides with CRISM, as well as THEMIS. Phyllosilicates also provide evidence for aqueous processes occurring during the Noachian period. Both studies determined that the phyllosilicates were deposited first.

== See also ==
- Mineralogy of Mars
