= Bilad al-Wafi =

Bilad al-Wafi بلادالوافي
- Sub-district
- Location in Yemen
- Coordinates: 13°32′37″N 43°52′28″E
- Country: Yemen
- Governorate: Taiz Governorate
- District: Jabal Habashi District
- Elevation: 1,410 m (4,630 ft)

Population (2004)
  - Total: 19,507
- Time zone: UTC+3

Bilad al-Wafi (Arabic: بلادالوافي) is a sub-district located in the Jabal Habashi District, Taiz Governorate, Yemen. Bilad al-Wafi had a population of 19,507 according to the 2004 census.
