= Wafi Salih =

Venezuelan writer (born 1965)

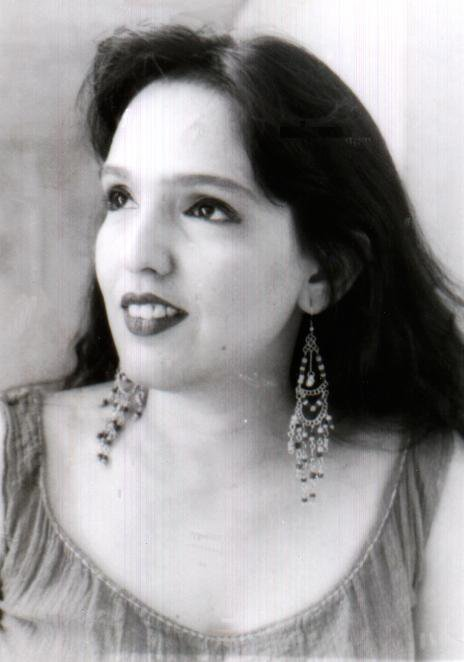
The young Wafi Salih (1987) in her university training stage, had already published "Adagio", her first book.

Wafi Salih (born 5 June 1965 in Trujillo) is a Venezuelan-born writer of Lebanese descent. Writer of: poetry, short stories, essays, dramaturgy and film scripts. She is recognized as “the master of short poetry in Venezuela” for her extensive exploration of haiku poetry, a literary genre of Japanese origin. Her books has been translated into English, Arabic, French, Italian, Portuguese and Polish.

== Biography ==
Magister in Latin American Literature, graduated from the “Universidad de los Andes”. She has a doctoral project in History and twenty books published in several genres. She was founder of “José Antonio Ramos Sucre” a literary workshop for seven consecutive years, which contributed to the training of Venezuelan artists and researchers.

Her thesis about female gender, is an innovative proposal about feminism. A profuse reflection that opens a question about the modes of cultural production and its effects on the social being. This research was published in Monte Ávila Editores in 2007 under the name: “The images of the absent”.

== Bibliography ==
=== Poetry ===
- Adagio (Adage) (1987)
- Los cantos de la noche. (Songs of the night) (1990):
- Las horas del aire (The hours of the air) (1991)
- Pájaro de raíces (Bird of roots) (2002) Winner of the poetry contest “Every day a book”, 2004
- El Dios de las dunas (The God of the Dunes) (2005)
- Huésped del alba (Guest of dawn) (2006)
- Jugando con la poesía (Playing with poetry) (2006)
- Caligrafía del aire (Air Calligraphy) (2007)
- Cielos descalzos (Barefoot Skies) (2009)
- Vigilia de huesos (Vigil of bones) (2010)
- Con el índice de una lágrima (the index finger of a tear )
- Honor al fuego (Honor to the fire) (2018)
- Consonantes de agua (Water Consonants) (2018)
- Sojam (Sojam) (2018)
- Cielo avaro (Greedy heaven) (2018)
- Serena en la plenitud (Serene in the fullness) (2020) Anthology.

=== Essays and Narrative ===
- Las imágenes de la ausente. (The images of the absent) (2012) Essay.
- Más allá de lo que somos. (Beyond who we are) (2018) Essay.
- Hombre moreno viene en camino. (Black man is on his way): Theatrical monologues.
- Discípula de Jung. (Disciple of Jung) (2016): Story.
