= Harmony Gold =

Harmony Gold may refer to:

- Harmony Gold (mining), a South African gold mining company
- Harmony Gold USA, an American film and television production company
