= Stockwork =

Geology term

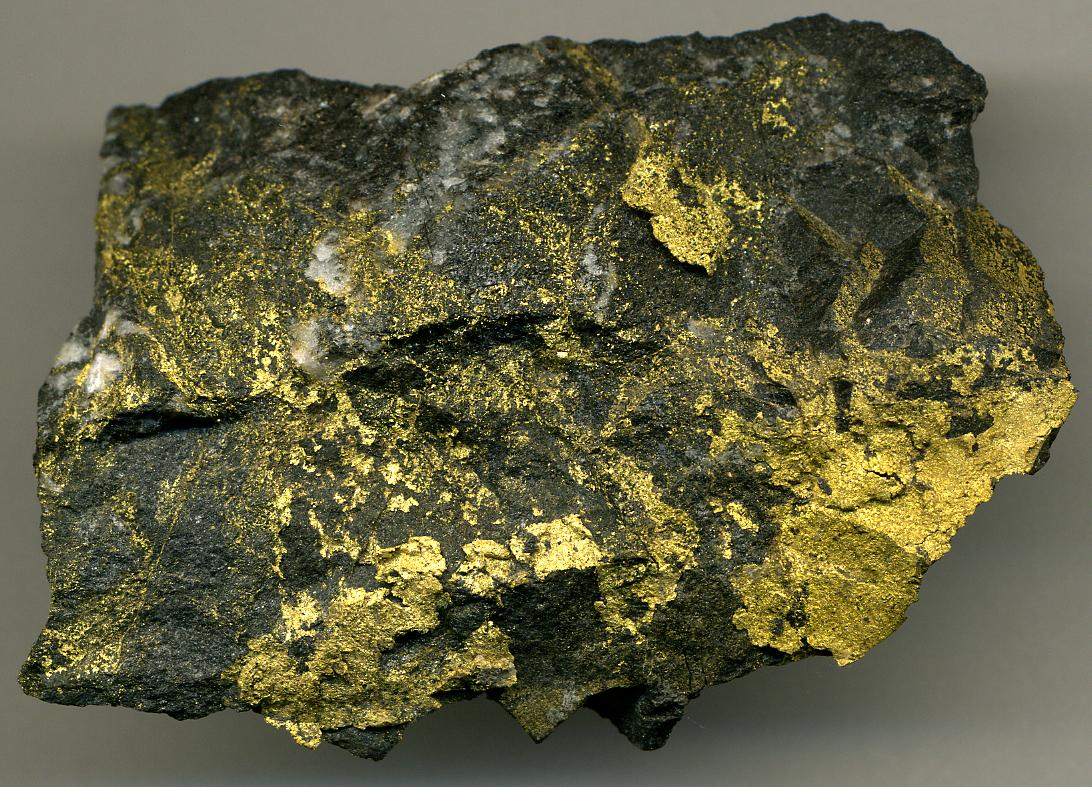
Sample of gold ore from the Red Lake Mine consisting of a stockwork of gold filled veinlets (sample width: 6.6 cm)

In geology, a stockwork is a complex system of structurally controlled or randomly oriented veins. Stockworks are common in many ore deposit types and in greisens. They are also referred to as stringer zones.
