= Compact Reconnaissance Imaging Spectrometer for Mars =

Visible-infrared spectrometer

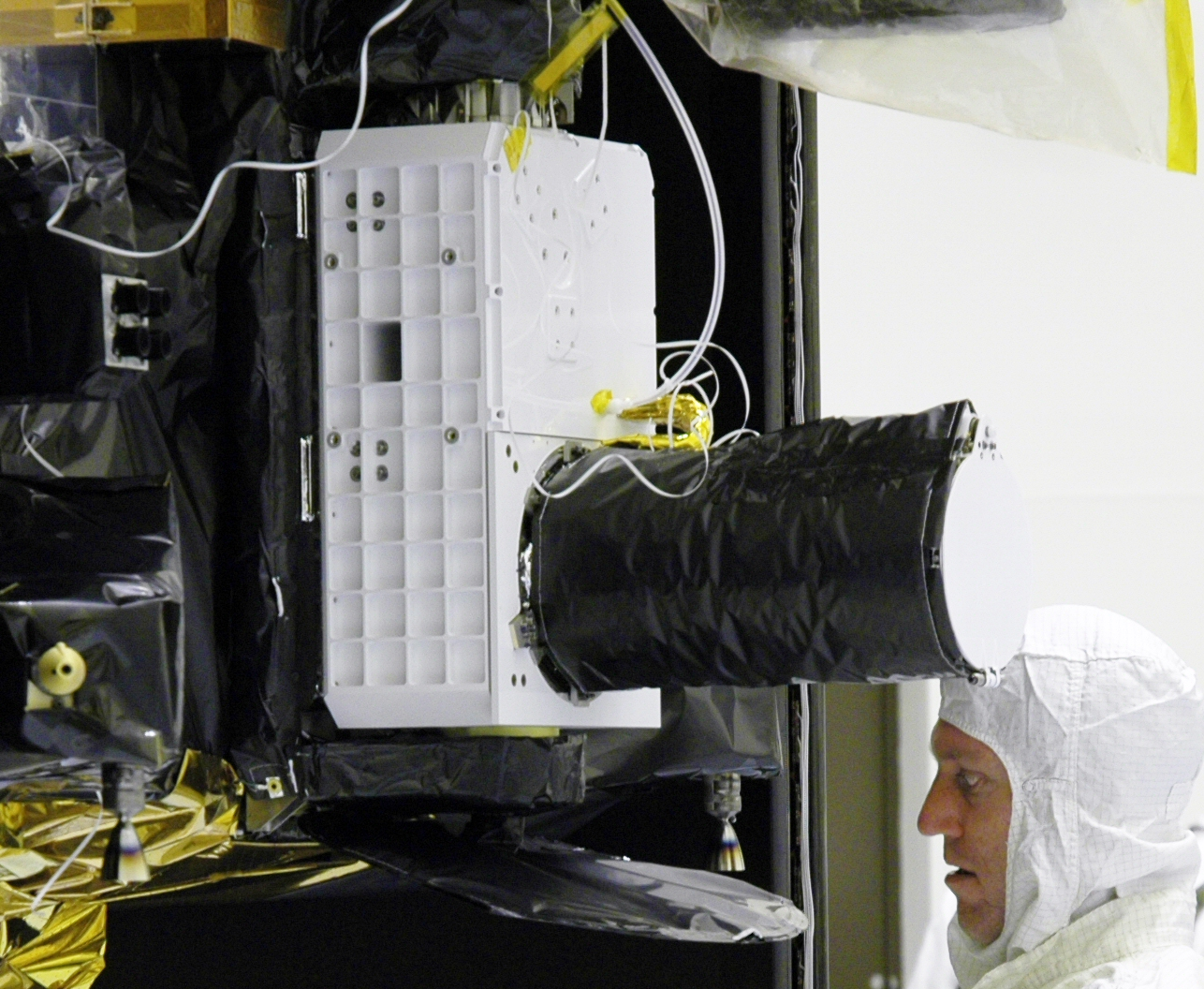
A NASA engineer and the CRISM instrument.

The Compact Reconnaissance Imaging Spectrometer for Mars (CRISM) was a visible-infrared spectrometer aboard the Mars Reconnaissance Orbiter searching for mineralogic indications of past and present water on Mars. The CRISM instrument team comprised scientists from over ten universities and was led by principal investigator Scott Murchie. CRISM was designed, built, and tested by the Johns Hopkins University Applied Physics Laboratory.

== Objectives ==
CRISM was being used to identify locations on Mars that may have hosted water, a solvent considered important in the search for past or present life on Mars. In order to do this, CRISM was mapping the presence of minerals and chemicals that may indicate past interaction with water - low-temperature or hydrothermal. These materials include iron and oxides, which can be chemically altered by water, and phyllosilicates and carbonates, which form in the presence of water. All of these materials have characteristic patterns in their visible-infrared reflections and were readily seen by CRISM. In addition, CRISM was monitoring ice and dust particulates in the Martian atmosphere to learn more about its climate and seasons.

== Instrument overview ==
CRISM measured visible and infrared electromagnetic radiation from 362 to 3920 nanometers in 6.55 nanometer increments. The instrument had two modes, a multispectral untargeted mode and a hyperspectral targeted mode. In the untargeted mode, CRISM reconnoiters Mars, recording approximately 50 of its 544 measurable wavelengths at a resolution of 100 to 200 meters per pixel. In this mode CRISM mapped half of Mars within a few months after aerobraking and most of the planet after one year. The objective of this mode is to identify new scientifically interesting locations that could be further investigated. In targeted mode, the spectrometer measured energy in all 544 wavelengths. When the MRO spacecraft is at an altitude of 300 km, CRISM detects a narrow but long strip on the Martian surface about 18 kilometers across and 10,800 kilometers long. The instrument swept this strip across the surface as MRO orbits Mars to image the surface.

== Instrument design ==
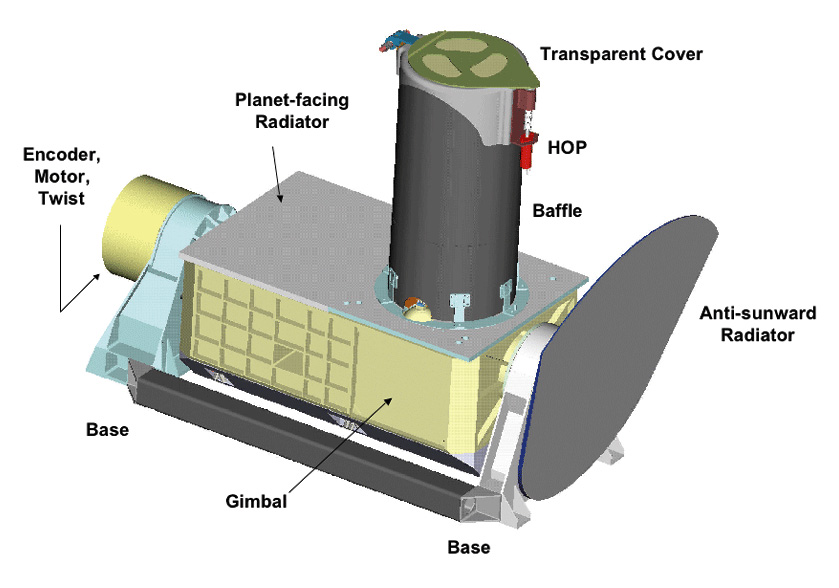
A diagram of the CRISM instrument.

The data collecting part of CRISM was called the Optical Sensor Unit (OSU) and consisted of two spectrographs, one that detected visible light from 400 to 830 nm and one that detected infrared light from 830 to 4050 nm. The infrared detector was cooled to –173° Celsius (–280° Fahrenheit) by a radiator plate and three cryogenic coolers. While in targeted mode, the instrument gimbals in order to continue pointing at one area even though the MRO spacecraft is moving. The extra time collecting data over a targeted area increases the signal-to-noise ratio as well as the spatial and spectral resolution of the image. This scanning ability also allowed the instrument to perform emission phase functions, viewing the same surface through variable amounts of atmosphere, which would be used to determine atmospheric properties. The Data Processing Unit (DPU) of CRISM performs in-flight data processing including compressing the data before transmission.

== Investigations ==
CRISM began its exploration of Mars in late 2006. Results from the OMEGA visible/near-infrared spectrometer on Mars Express (2003–present), the Mars Exploration Rovers (MER; 2003–2019), the TES thermal emission spectrometer on Mars Global Surveyor (MGS; 1997-2006), and the THEMIS thermal imaging system on Mars Odyssey (2004–present) helped to frame the themes for CRISM's exploration:

- Where and when did Mars have persistently wet environments?
- What is the composition of Mars' crust?
- What are the characteristics of Mars' modern climate?

In November 2018, it was announced that CRISM had fabricated some additional pixels representing the minerals alunite, kieserite, serpentine and perchlorate. The instrument team found that some false positives were caused by a filtering step when the detector switches from a high luminosity area to shadows. Reportedly, 0.05% of the pixels were indicating perchlorate, now known to be a false high estimate by this instrument. However, both the Phoenix lander and the Curiosity rover measured 0.5% perchlorates in the soil, suggesting a global distribution of these salts. Perchlorate is of interest to astrobiologists, as it sequesters water molecules from the atmosphere and reduces its freezing point, potentially creating thin films of watery brine that —although toxic to most Earth life— it could potentially offer habitats for native Martian microbes in the shallow subsurface. (See: Life on Mars#Perchlorates)

=== Persistently wet environments ===
Aqueous minerals are minerals that form in water, either by chemical alteration of pre-existing rock or by precipitation out of solution. The minerals indicate where liquid water existed long enough to react chemically with rock. Which minerals form depends on temperature, salinity, pH, and composition of the parent rock. Which aqueous minerals are present on Mars therefore provides important clues to understanding past environments. The OMEGA spectrometer on the Mars Express orbiter and the MER rovers both uncovered evidence for aqueous minerals. OMEGA revealed two distinct kinds of past aqueous deposits. The first, containing sulfates such as gypsum and kieserite, is found in layered deposits of Hesperian age (Martian middle age, roughly from 3.7 to 3 billion years ago). The second, rich in several different kinds of phyllosilicates, instead occurs rocks of Noachian age (older than about 3.7 billion years). The different ages and mineral chemistries suggest an early water-rich environment in which phyllosilicates formed, followed by a dryer, more saline and acidic environment in which sulfates formed. The MER Opportunity rover spent years exploring sedimentary rocks formed in the latter environment, full of sulfates, salts, and oxidized iron minerals.

Soil forms from parent rocks through physical disintegration of rocks and by chemical alteration of the rock fragments. The types of soil minerals can reveal if the environment was cool or warm, wet or dry, or whether the water was fresh or salty. Because CRISM is able to detect many minerals in the soil or regolith, the instrument is being used to help decipher ancient Martian environments. CRISM has found a characteristic layering pattern of aluminum-rich clays overlying iron- and magnesium-rich clays in many areas scattered through Mars' highlands. Surrounding Mawrth Vallis, these "layered clays" cover hundreds of thousands of square kilometers. Similar layering occurs near the Isidis basin, in the Noachian plains surrounding Valles Marineris, and in Noachian plains surrounding the Tharsis plateau. The global distribution of layered clays suggests a global process. Layered clays are late Noachian in age, dating from the same time as water-carved valley networks. The layered clay composition is similar to what is expected for soil formation on Earth - a weathered upper layer leached of soluble iron and magnesium, leaving an insoluble aluminum-rich residue, with a lower layer that still retains its iron and magnesium. Some researchers have suggested that the Martian clay "layer cake" was created by soil-forming processes, including rainfall, at the time that valley networks formed.

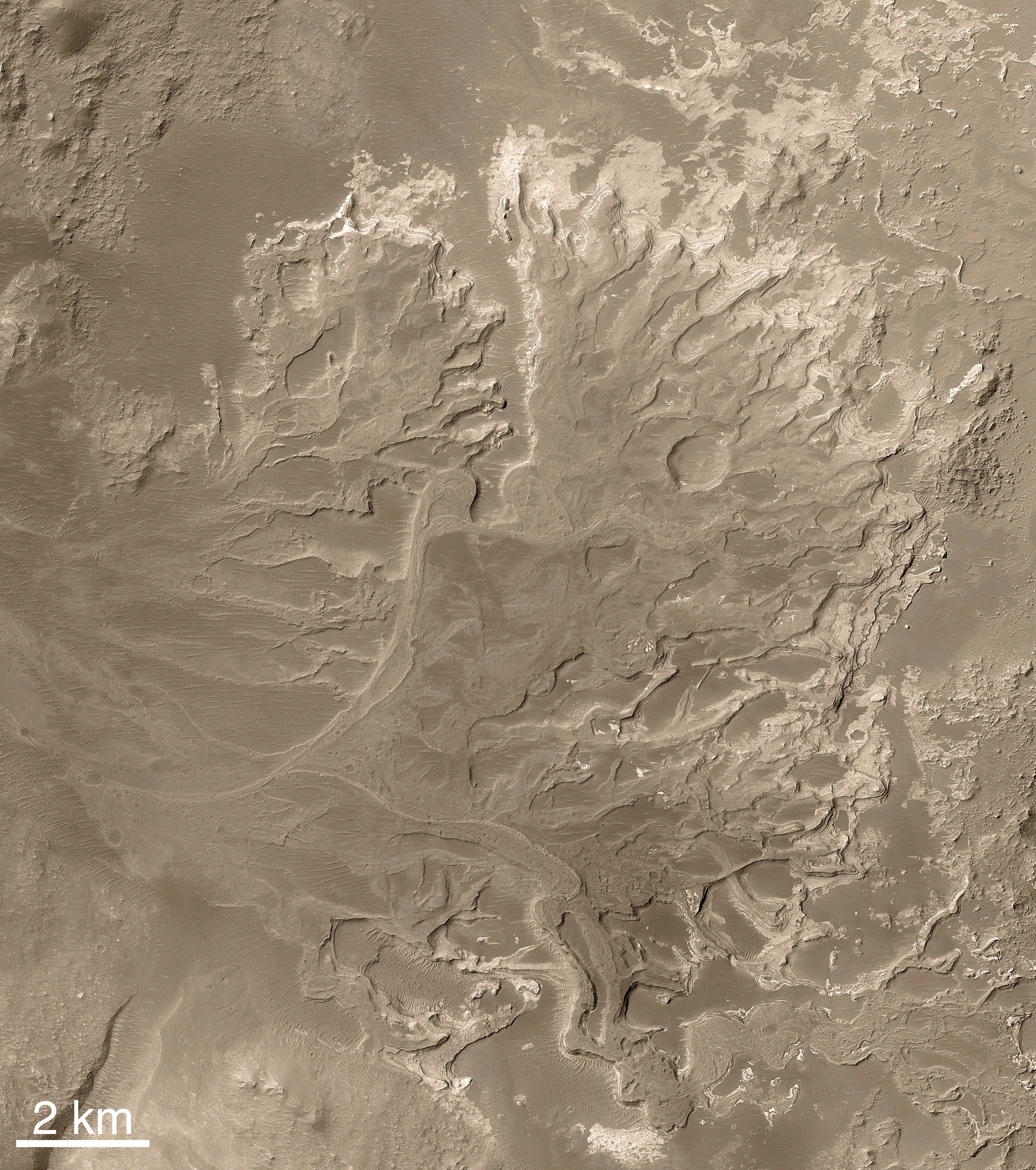
The delta in Eberswalde crater, as imaged by MOC

Lake and marine environments on Earth are favorable for fossil preservation, especially where the sediments they left behind are rich in carbonates or clays. Hundreds of highland craters on Mars have horizontally layered, sedimentary rocks that may have formed in lakes. CRISM has taken many targeted observations of these rocks to measure their mineralogy and how the minerals vary between layers. Variation between layers helps us to understand the sequence of events that formed the sedimentary rocks. The Mars Orbiter Camera found that where valley networks empty into craters, commonly the craters contain fan-shaped deposits. However it was not completely clear if the fans formed by sediment deposition on dry crater floors (alluvial fans) or in crater lakes (deltas). CRISM discovered that in the fans' lowermost layers, there are concentrated deposits of clay. More clay occurs beyond the end of the fans on the crater floors, and in some cases there is also opal. On Earth, the lowermost layers of deltas are called bottom set beds, and they are made of clays that settled out of inflowing river water in quiet, deep parts of the lakes. This discovery supports the idea that many fans formed in crater lakes where, potentially, evidence for habitable environments could be preserved.

Not all ancient Martian lakes were fed by inflowing valley networks. CRISM discovered several craters on the western slope of Tharsis that contain "bathtub rings" of sulfate minerals and a kind of phyllosilicate called kaolinite. Both minerals can form together by precipitating out of acidic, saline water. These craters lack inflowing valley networks, showing that they were not fed by rivers - instead, they must have been fed by inflowing groundwater.

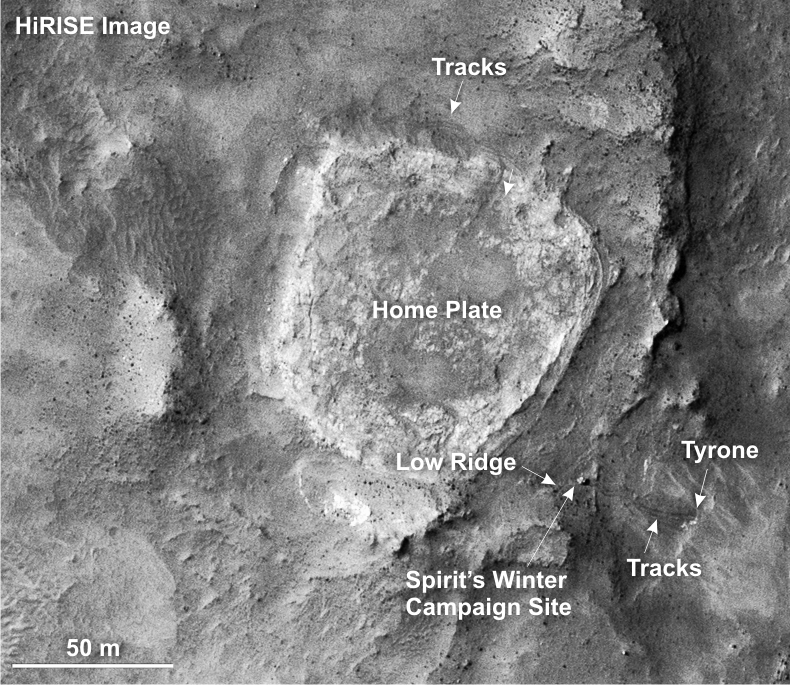
HiRISE image of the "Home Plate" rock outcrop

The identification of hot spring deposits was a priority for CRISM, because hot springs would have had energy (geothermal heat) and water, two basic requirements for life. One of the signatures of hot springs on Earth is deposits of silica. The MER Spirit rover explored a silica-rich deposit called "Home Plate" that is thought to have formed in a hot spring. CRISM has discovered other silica-rich deposits in many locations. Some are associated with central peaks of impact craters, which are sites of heating driven by meteor impact. Silica has also been identified on the flanks of volcanic inside the caldera of the Syrtis Major shield volcano, forming light-colored mounds that look like scaled-up versions of Home Plate. Elsewhere, in the westernmost parts of Valles Marineris, near the core of the Tharsis volcanic province, there are sulfate and clay deposits suggestive of "warm" springs. Hot spring deposits are one of the most promising areas on Mars to search for evidence for past life.

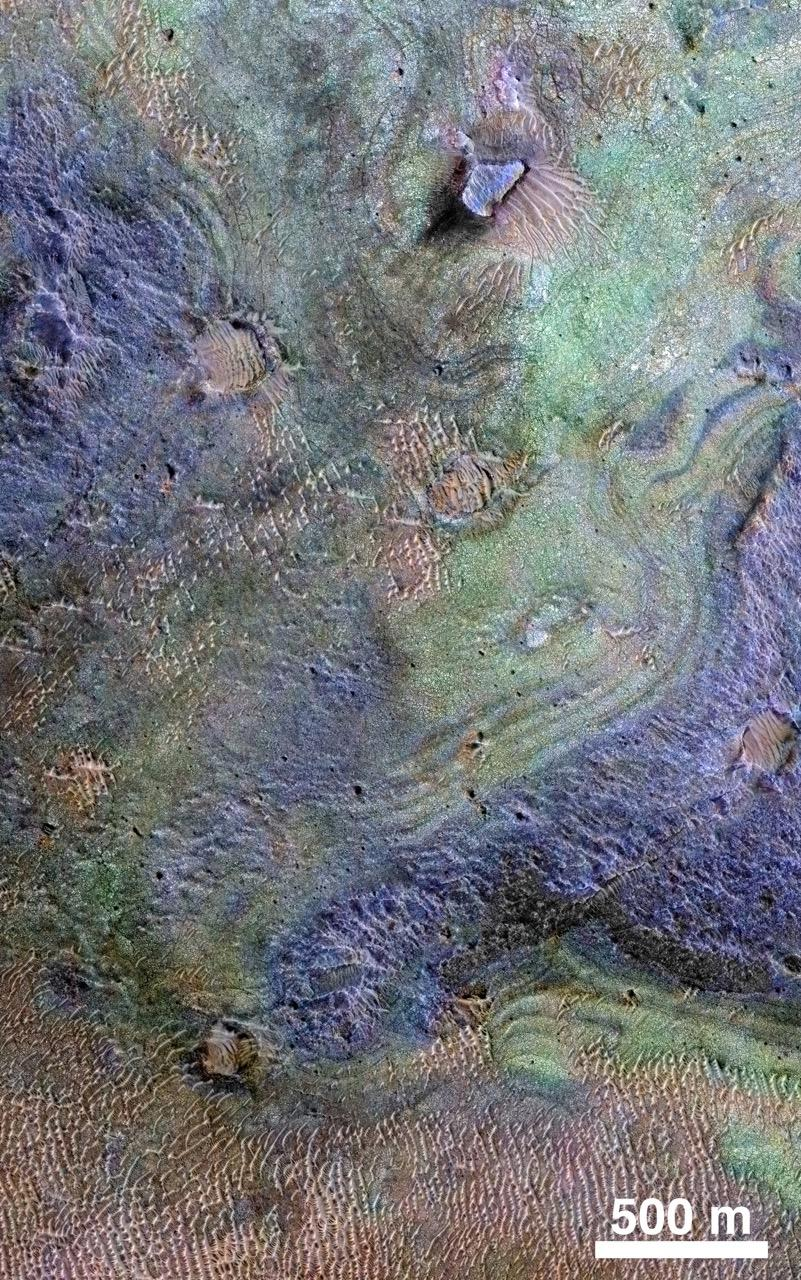
Nili Fossae on Mars - largest known carbonate deposit.

One of the leading hypotheses for why ancient Mars was wetter than today is that a thick, carbon dioxide-rich atmosphere created a global greenhouse, that warmed the surface enough for liquid water to occur in large amounts. Carbon dioxide ice in today's polar caps is too limited in volume to hold that ancient atmosphere. If a thick atmosphere ever existed, it was either blown into space by solar wind or impacts, or reacted with silicate rocks to become trapped as carbonates in Mars' crust. One of the goals that drove CRISM's design was to find carbonates, to try to solve this question about what happened to Mars' atmosphere. And one of CRISM's most important discoveries was the identification of carbonate bedrock in Nili Fossae in 2008. Soon thereafter, landed missions to Mars started identifying carbonates on the surface; the Phoenix Mars lander found between 3–5 wt% calcite (CaCO_{3}) at its northern lowland landing site, while the MER Spirit rover identified outcrops rich in magnesium-iron carbonate (16–34 wt%) in the Columbia Hills of Gusev crater. Later CRISM analyses identified carbonates in the rim of Huygens crater which suggested that there could be extensive deposits of buried carbonates on Mars. However, a study by CRISM scientists estimated that all of the carbonate rock on Mars holds less than the present Martian atmosphere worth of carbon dioxide. They determined that if a dense ancient Martian atmosphere did exist, it is probably not trapped in the crust.

=== Crustal composition ===
Understanding the composition of Mars' crust and how it changed with time tells us about many aspects of Mars' evolution as a planet, and was a major goal of CRISM. Remote and landed measurements prior to CRISM, and analysis of Martian meteorites, all suggest that the Martian crust is made mostly of basaltic igneous rock composed mostly of feldspar and pyroxene. Images from the Mars Orbiter Camera on MGS showed that in some places the upper few kilometers of the crust is composed of hundreds of thin volcanic lava flows. TES and THEMIS both found mostly basaltic igneous rock, with scattered olivine-rich and even some quartz-rich rocks.

The first recognition of widespread sedimentary rock on Mars came from the Mars Orbiter Camera which found that several areas of the planet - including Valles Marineris and Terra Arabia - have horizontally layered, light-toned rocks. Follow-up observations of those rocks' mineralogy by OMEGA found that some are rich in sulfate minerals, and that other layered rocks around Mawrth Vallis are rich in phyllosilicates. Both class of minerals are signatures of sedimentary rocks. CRISM had used its improved spatial resolution to look for other deposits of sedimentary rock on Mars' surface, and for layers of sedimentary rock buried between layers of volcanic rock in Mars' crust.

=== Modern climates ===
To understand Mars' ancient climate, and whether it might have created environments habitable for life, first we need to understand Mars' climate today. Each mission to Mars has made new advances in understanding its climate. Mars has seasonal variations in the abundances of water vapor, water ice clouds and hazes, and atmospheric dust. During southern summer, when Mars is closest to the Sun (at perihelion), solar heating can raise massive dust storms. Regional dust storms - ones having a 1000-kilometer scale - show surprising repeatability Mars-year to Mars-year. Once every decade or so, they grow into global-scale events. In contrast, during northern summer when Mars is furthest from the Sun (at aphelion), there is an equatorial water-ice cloud belt and very little dust in the atmosphere. Atmospheric water vapor varies in abundance seasonally, with the greatest abundances in each hemisphere's summer after the seasonal polar caps have sublimated into the atmosphere. During winter, both water and carbon dioxide frost and ices form on Mars' surface. These ices form the seasonal and residual polar caps. The seasonal caps - which form each autumn and sublimate each spring - are dominated by carbon dioxide ice. The residual caps - which persist year after year - consist mostly of water ice at the north pole and water ice with a thin veneer (a few 10's of meters thick) of carbon dioxide ice at the south pole.

Mars' atmosphere is so thin and wispy that solar heating of dust and ice in the atmosphere - not heating of the atmospheric gases - is more important in driving weather. Small, suspended particles of dust and water ice - aerosols - intercept 20–30% of incoming sunlight, even under relatively clear conditions. So variations in the amounts of these aerosols have a huge influence on climate. CRISM had taken three major kinds of measurements of dust and ice in the atmosphere: targeted observations whose repeated views of the surface provide a sensitive estimate of aerosol abundance; special global grids of targeted observations every couple of months designed especially to track spatial and seasonal variations; and scans across the planet's limb to show how dust and ice vary with height above the surface.

The south polar seasonal cap has a bizarre variety of bright and dark streaks and spots that appear during spring, as carbon dioxide ice sublimates. Prior to MRO there were various ideas for processes that could form these strange features, a leading model being carbon dioxide geysers. CRISM had watched the dark spots grow during southern spring, and found that bright streaks forming alongside the dark spots are made of fresh, new carbon dioxide frost, pointing like arrows back to their sources - the same sources as the dark spots. The bright streaks probably form by expansion, cooling, and freezing of the carbon dioxide gas, forming a "smoking gun" to support the geyser hypothesis.

== See also ==
- Nadir and Occultation for Mars Discovery (another Spectrometer in Mars orbit since 2016, on ExoMars)
- Ralph (New Horizons) (imaging spectrometer on New Horizons)
