= Pherai (Parthia) =

Only Stephanos Byzantios mentions the city Pherai (Φεραί Παρθίας): «εἰσὶ καὶ ἄλλαι Ἰαπυγίας καὶ Αἰτωλίας καὶ Παρθυαίων» (there are others in Iapygia, Aitolia and among the Parthians). It is unknown whether it was a Hellenistic military settlement.

Thessalian cavalry men were in service of Alexander's army and his successors. Perhaps these Thessalians came from the homonymous city in Thessalia (Pherae) and established a colony in Parthia. There was also a Thessalian colony in Syria called Larissa.

== Sources ==
Notes

Bibliography

- Johann Gustav Droysen Geschichte des Hellenismus.
- Stephanus of Byzantium Ethnika.
