= Terby (crater) =

- Planet: Mars
- Coordinates: 28.3°S 285.9°W
- Quadrangle: Iapygia
- Diameter: 174 km (108 mi)
- Eponym: François J. Terby

Terby is a crater on the northern edge of Hellas Planitia, Mars. It is in the Iapygia quadrangle. The 174-kilometre-diameter (108 mi) crater is centered at 28°S, 73°E with an elevation of −5 km (−3.1 mi). The crater is named after the Belgian astronomer François J. Terby. It is the site of an ancient lakebed and has clay deposits. Using data from Mars Global Surveyor, Mars Odyssey, Mars Express, and Mars Reconnaissance Orbiter missions researchers believe Terby's layers were formed from sediments settling under water. Crater counts show this happened during the Noachian period. It used to be thought that Terby Crater contained a large delta. However, newer observations have led researchers to think of the layered sequence as part of a group of layers that may have extended all the across Hellas. There is no valley large enough at the northern rim of Terby to have carried the large amount of sediments necessary to produce the layers. Other details in the layers argue against Terby's containing a delta. Fan deposits are some of the thickest on Mars. Hydrated minerals, including iron/magnesium phyllosilicates, have been detected in several layers.

== Images ==
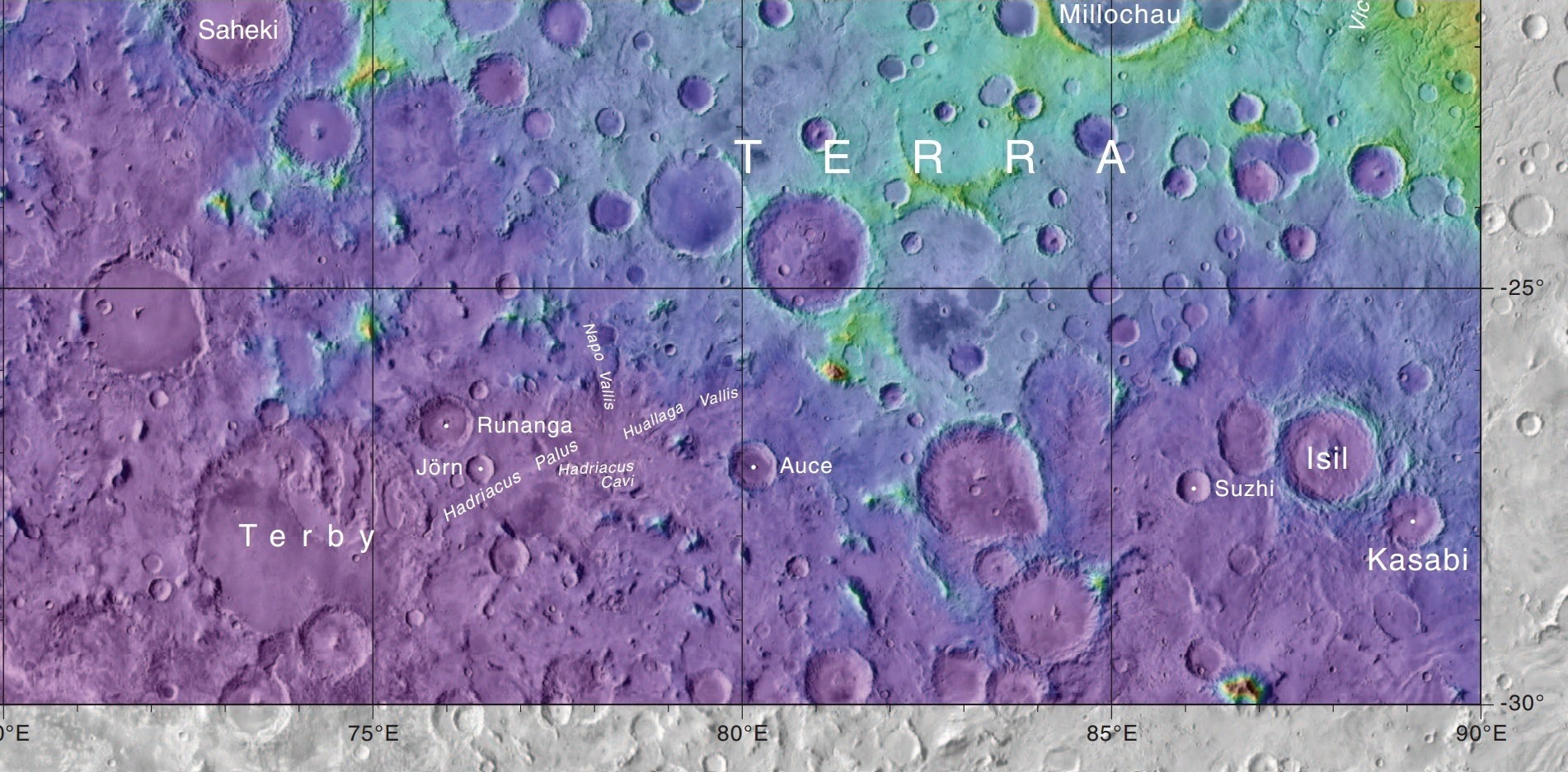
MOLA map showing Terby Crater and nearby craters. Colors indicate elevations.

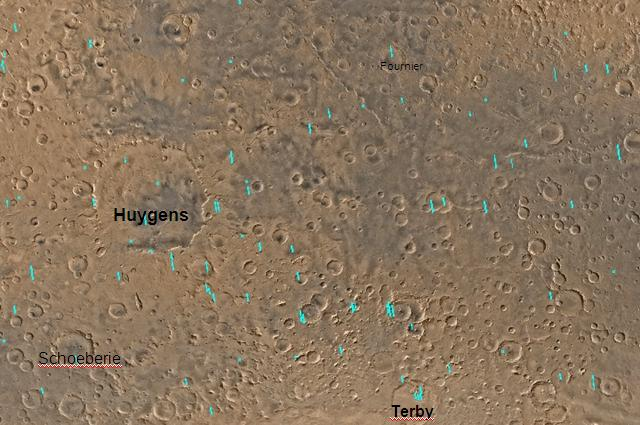
Map of Iapygia quadrangle with major craters.

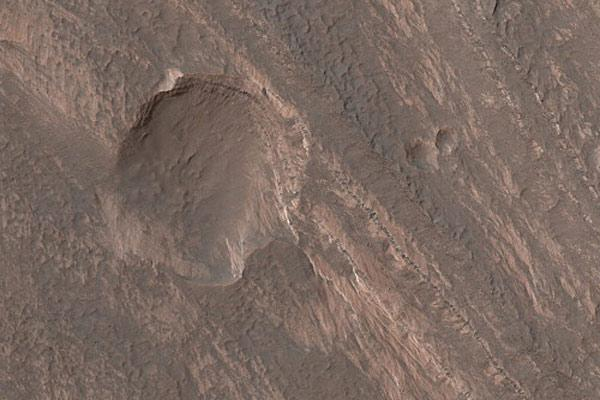
Terby crater - contains many rock layers.

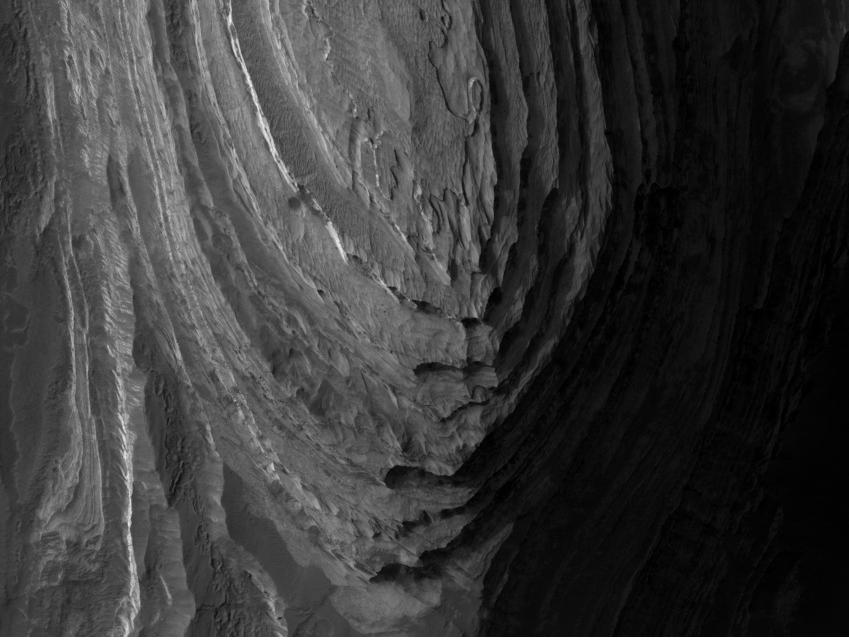
Layers in Terby crater may have formed when the Hellas basin was filled with water.

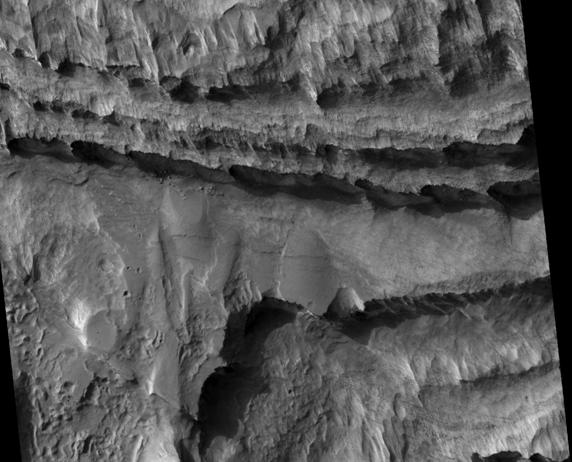
Terby Crater layers as seen by HiRISE.

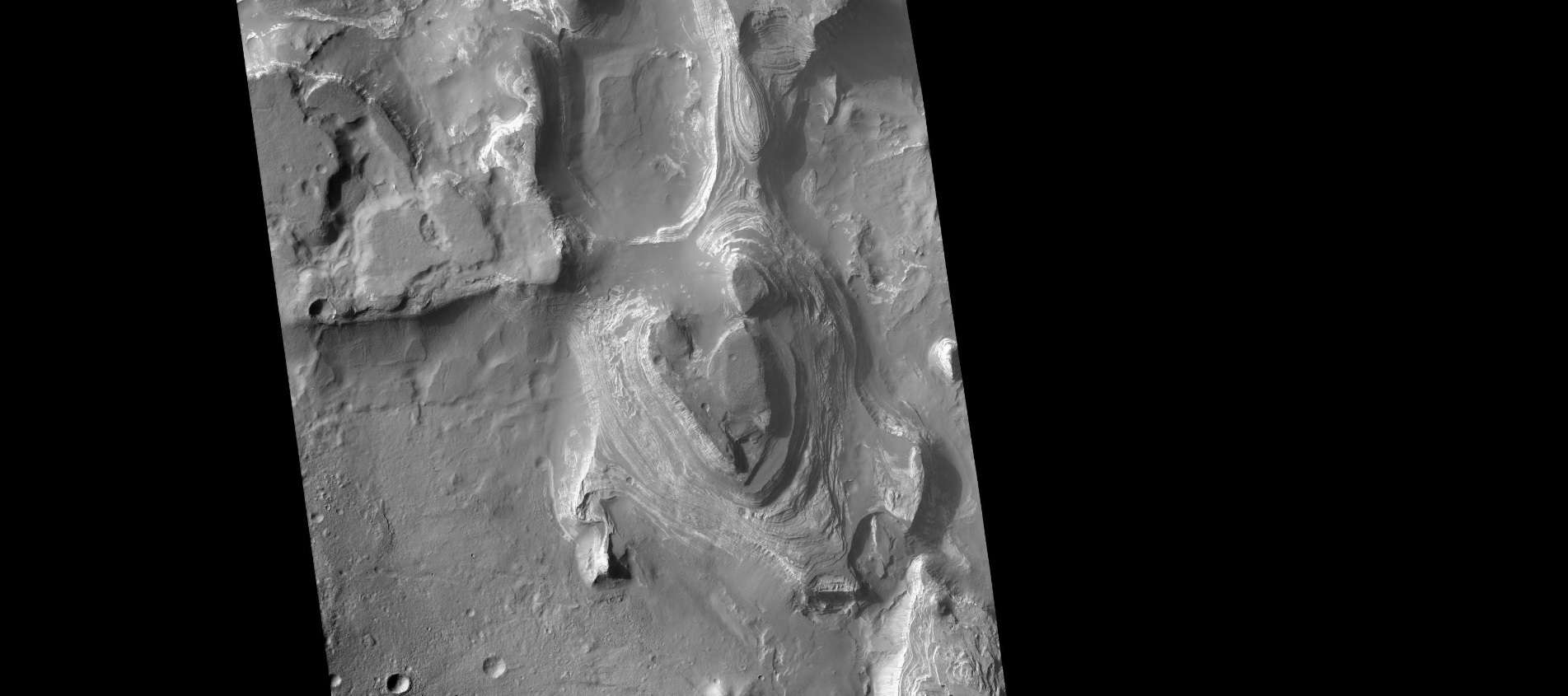
Northern part of Terby Crater showing many layers, as seen by CTX camera (on Mars Reconnaissance Orbiter). Parts of this image are enlarged in next two images.

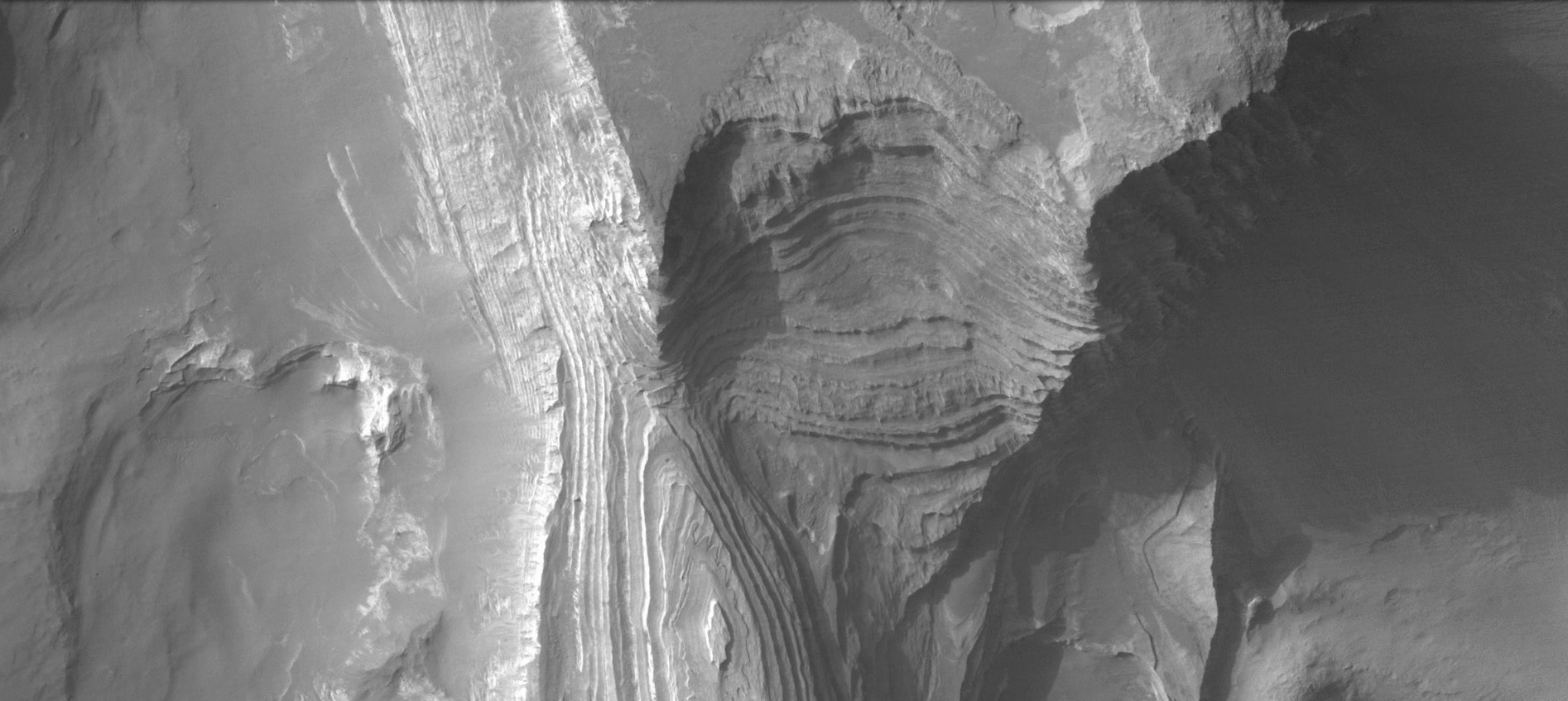
Northern part of Terby Crater showing many layers, as seen by CTX camera (on Mars Reconnaissance Orbiter).

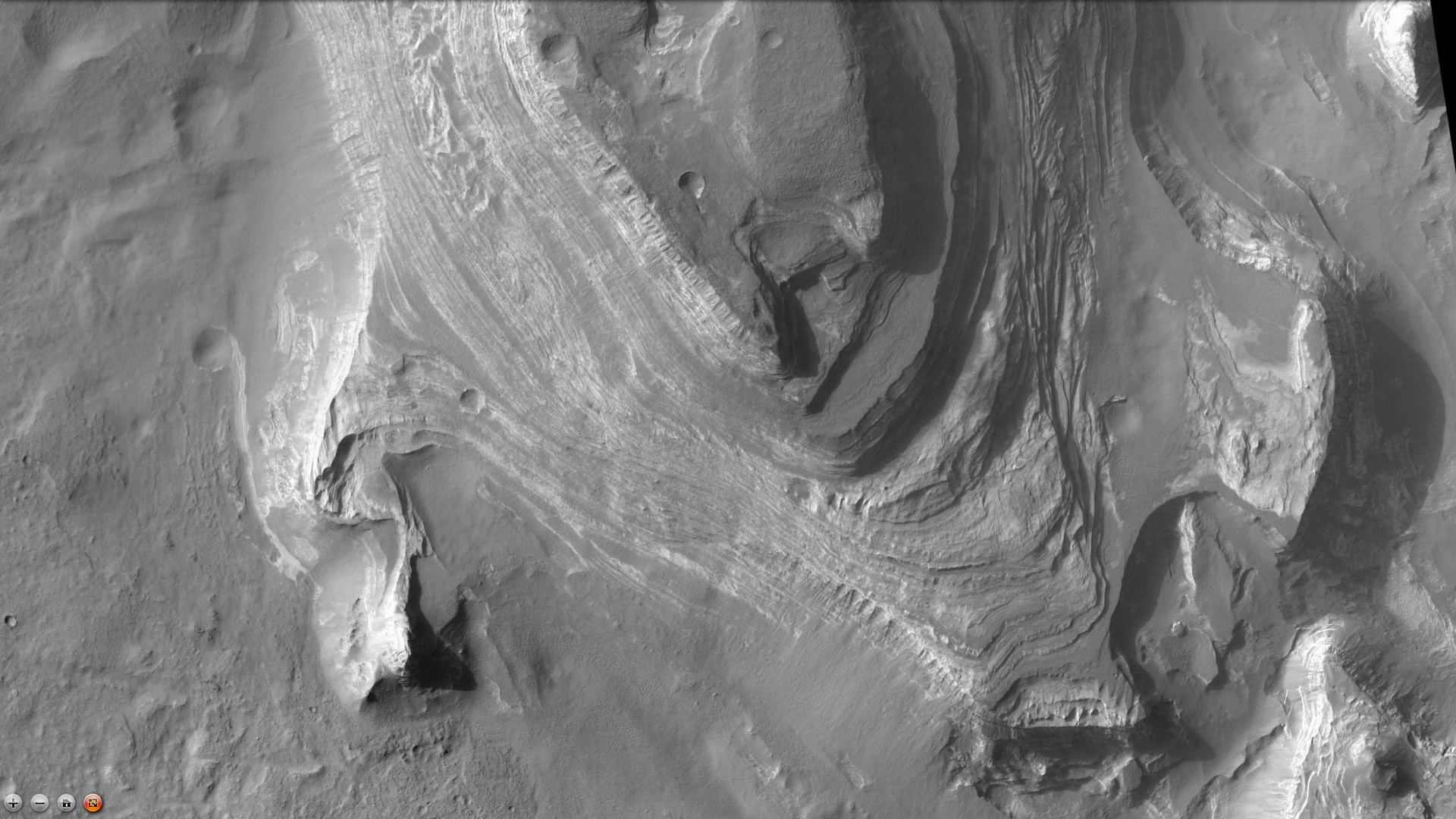
Northern part of Terby Crater showing many layers, as seen by CTX camera (on Mars Reconnaissance Orbiter).

== See also ==
- Climate of Mars
- HiRISE
- HiWish program
- Hydrothermal circulation
- Impact event
- Lakes on Mars
- List of craters on Mars
- Ore genesis
- Ore resources on Mars
- Water on Mars
