= Huygens (crater) =

Crater on Mars

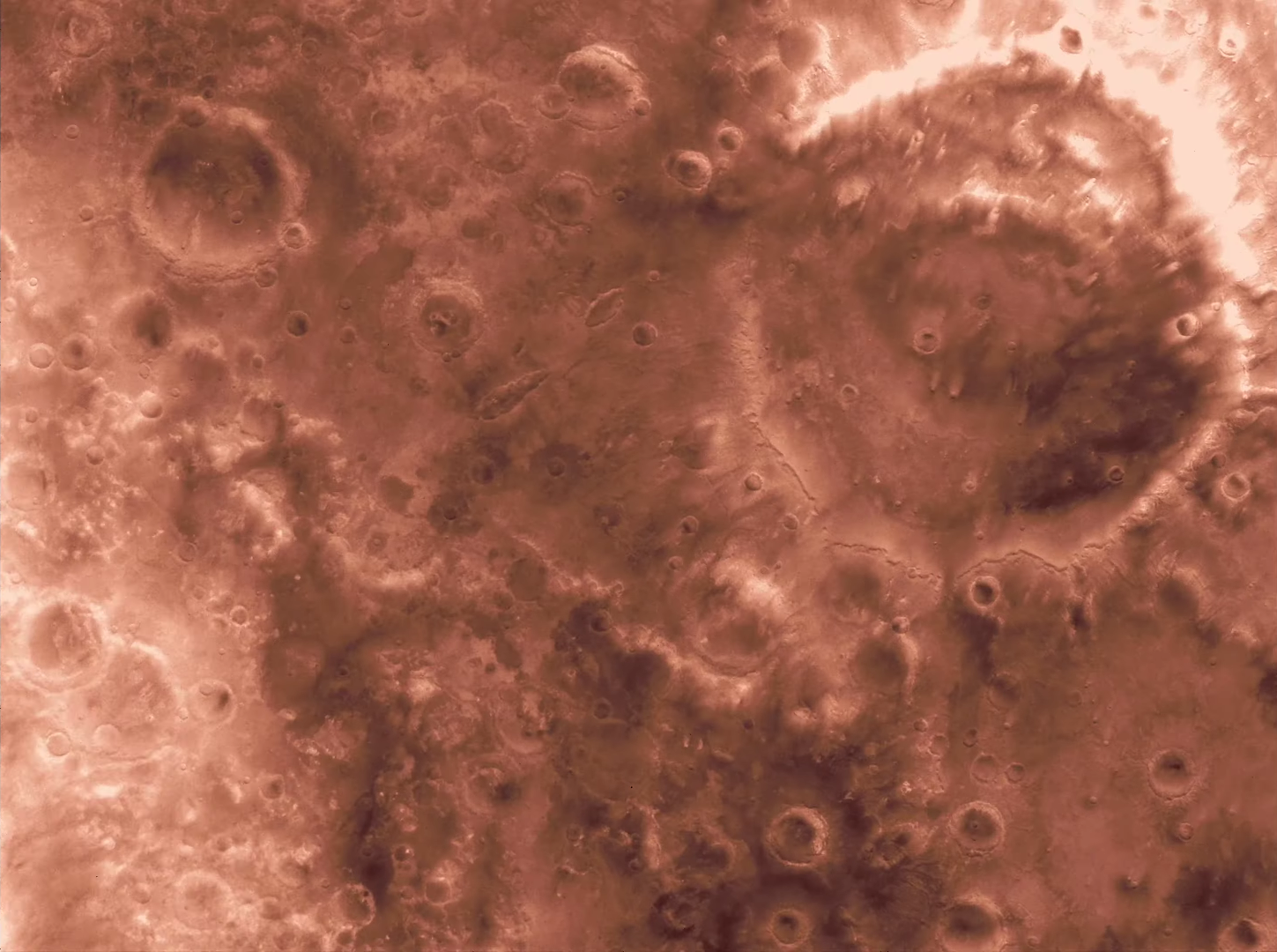
- A natural-color image of Huygens crater (upper right corner) on Mars, taken by the Psyche space probe on 15 May 2026.
- Planet: Mars
- Coordinates: 13.9°S 304.4°W
- Quadrangle: Iapygia
- Diameter: 467 km
- Eponym: Christiaan Huygens

Huygens is an impact crater on Mars named in honour of the Dutch astronomer, mathematician and physicist Christiaan Huygens. It is the fifth largest recognizable impact crater on Mars after Utopia, Hellas, Argyre, and Isidis, and the largest one with a near intact rim.

The crater is approximately 467.25 km (290.34 mi) in diameter and can be found at 304.42°W 13.88°S, in the Iapygia quadrangle.

Scientists were delighted to see branched channels in pictures taken with spacecraft that were sent in orbit around Mars. The existence of these channels is strong evidence that much water once flowed on the surface of the planet. Simple organisms may have once lived where water once was. An excellent group of these channels is shown in the picture below from the rim of Huygens taken with THEMIS.

Carbonates (calcium or iron carbonates) were discovered in a crater on the rim of Huygens. The impact on the rim exposed material that had been dug up from the impact that created Huygens. These minerals represent evidence that Mars once had a thicker carbon dioxide atmosphere with abundant moisture. Carbonates of these kinds only form when there is much water. They were found with the Compact Reconnaissance Imaging Spectrometer for Mars (CRISM) instrument on the Mars Reconnaissance Orbiter. Earlier, the instrument had detected clay minerals. The carbonates were found near the clay minerals. Both of these minerals form in wet environments. It is supposed that billions of years ago Mars was much warmer and wetter. At that time, carbonates would have formed from water and the carbon dioxide-rich atmosphere. Later the deposits of carbonate would have been buried. The double impact has now exposed the minerals. Earth has vast carbonate deposits in the form of limestone.

== Images ==
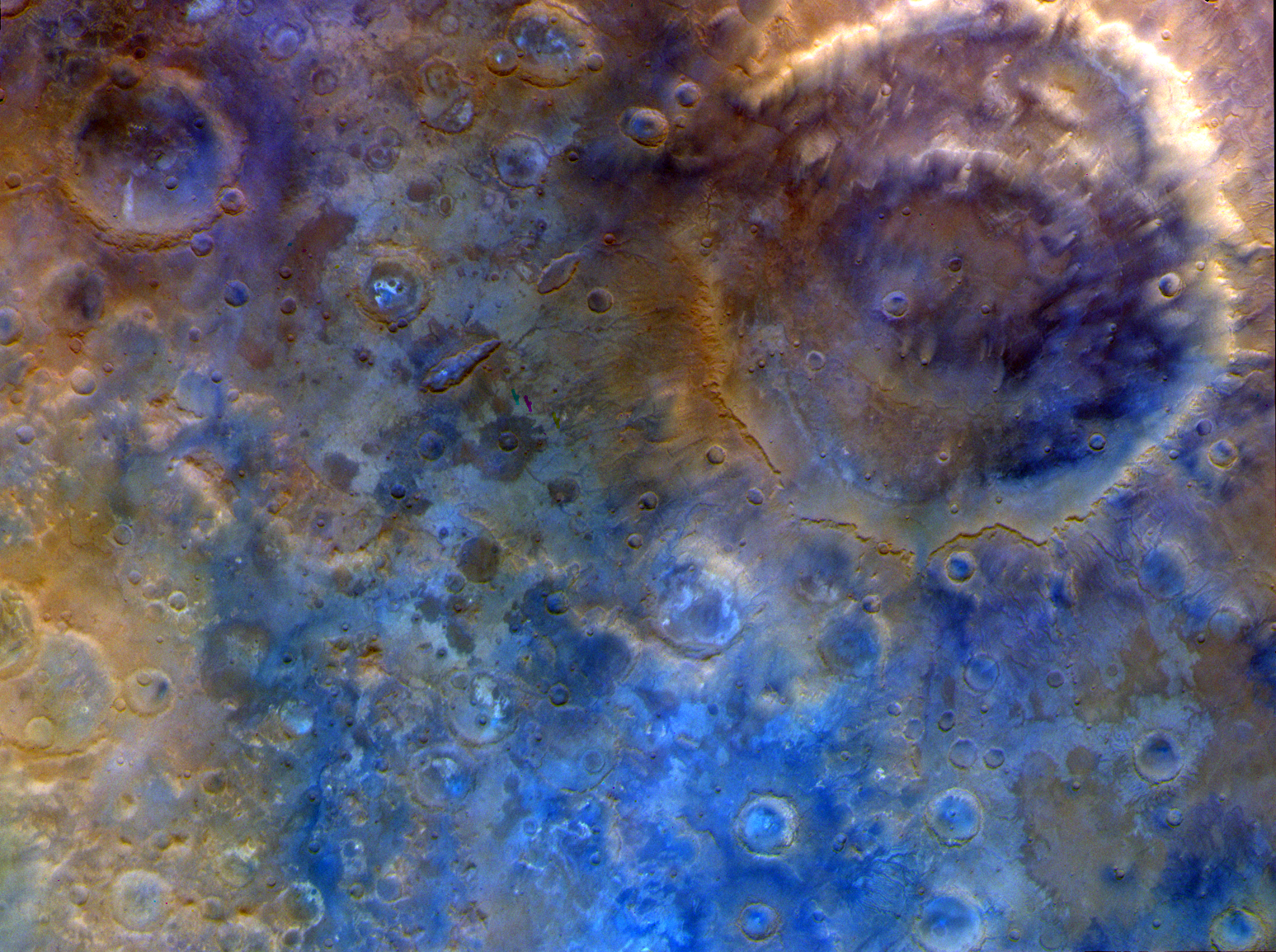
An enhanced-color image of Huygens crater, taken by the Psyche space probe in May 2026.

A greyscale image of Huygens crater, with a globe of Mars showing its location on the Red Planet.

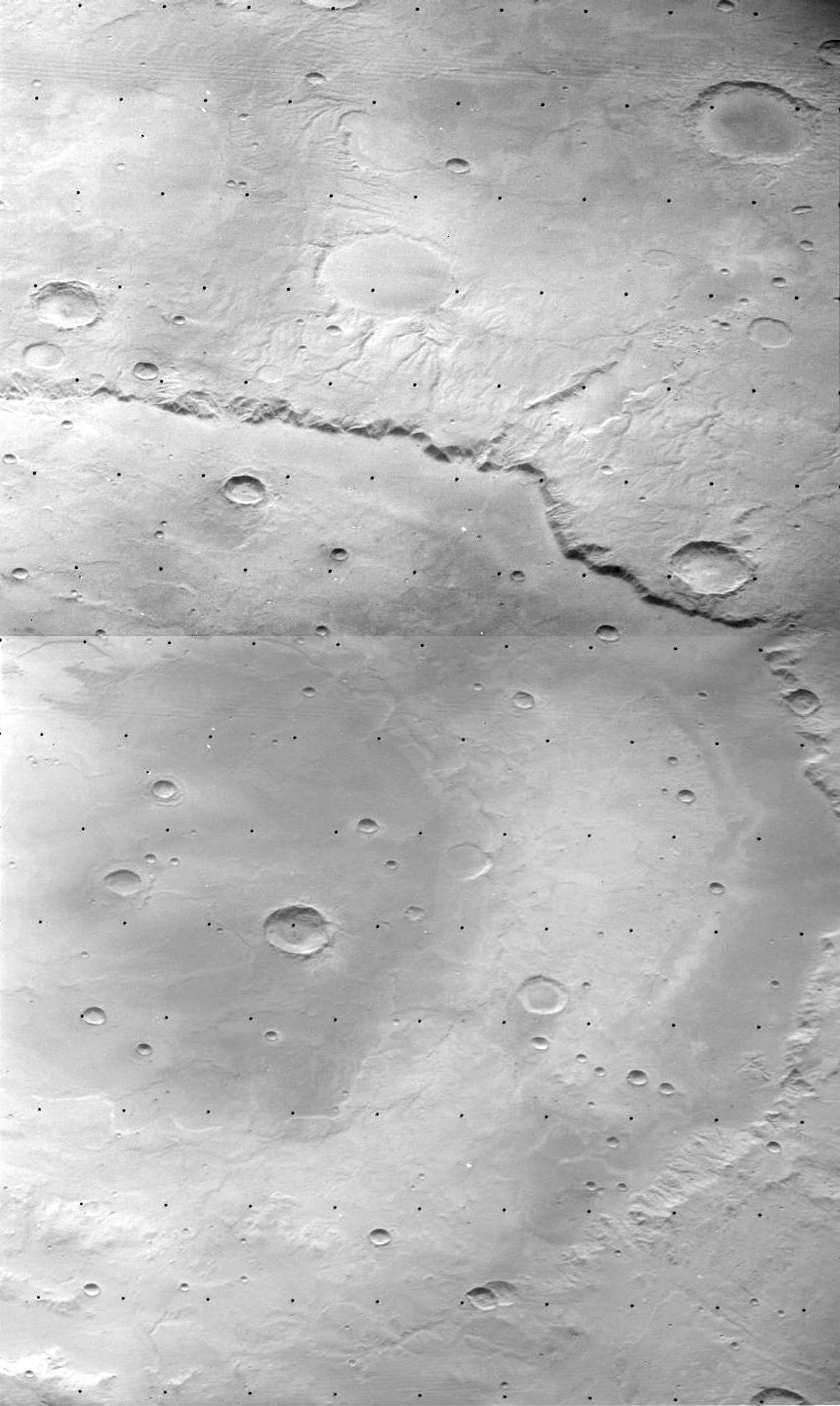
Viking Orbiter 1 mosaic of part of Huygens

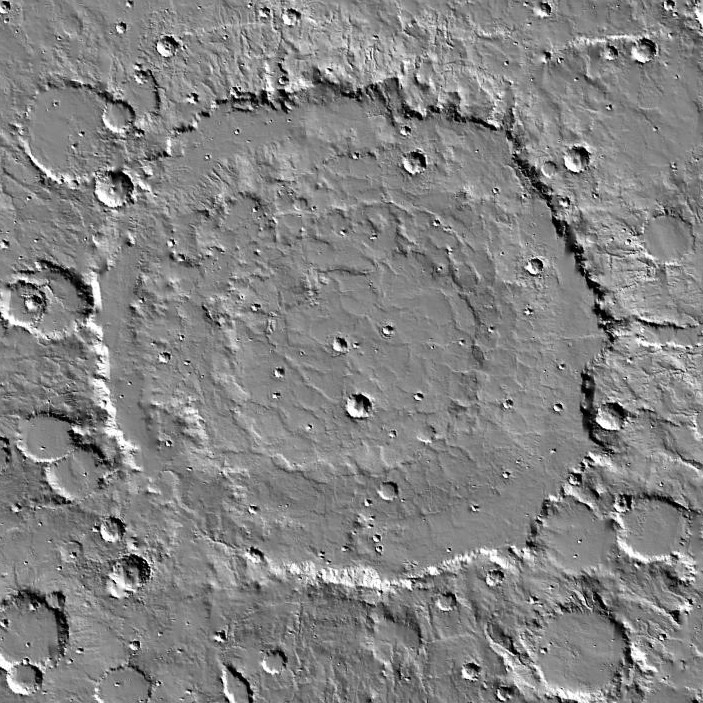
Shaded relief topographic map of Huygens crater

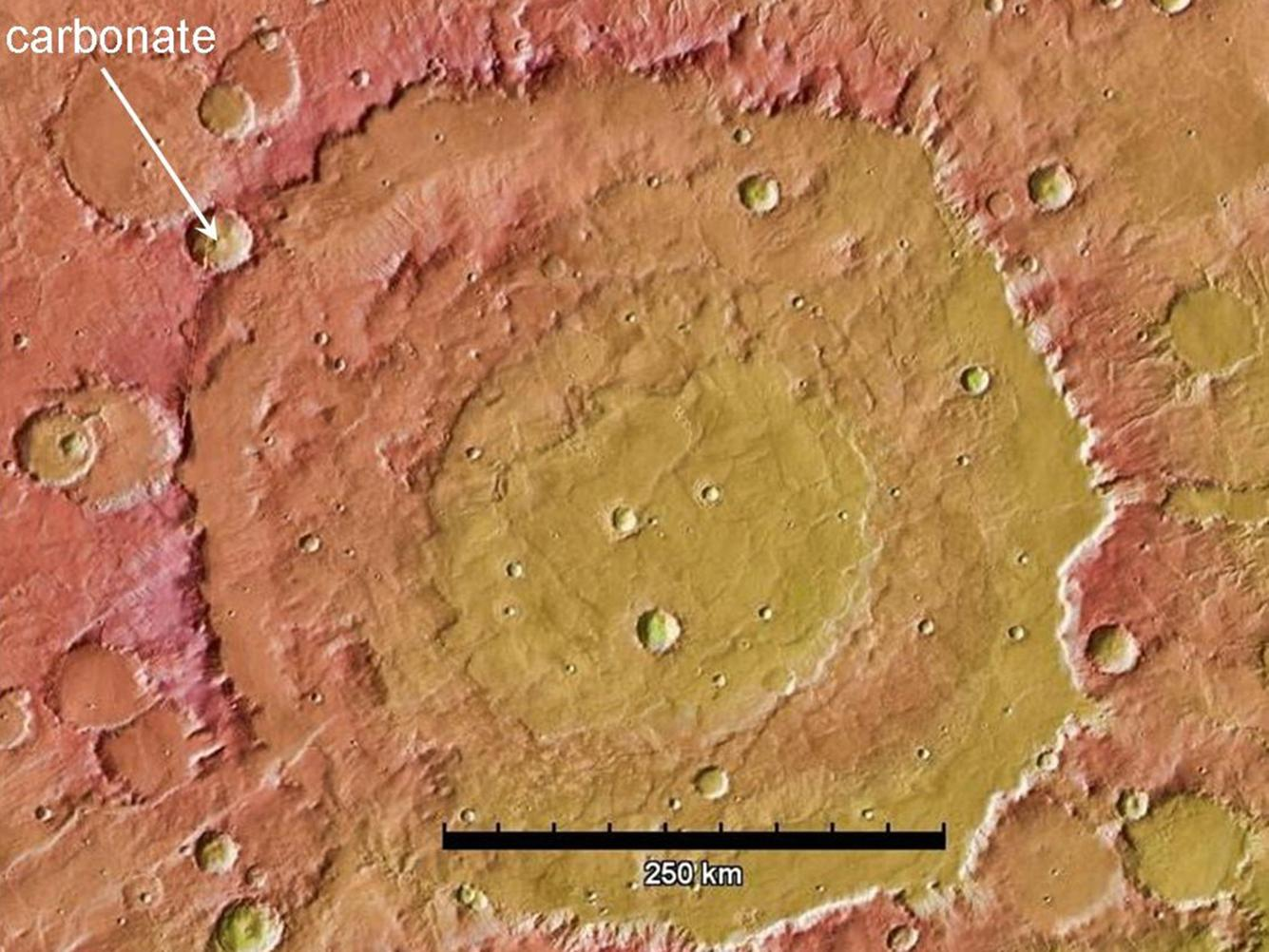
Huygens crater - place where carbonate was discovered is noted.

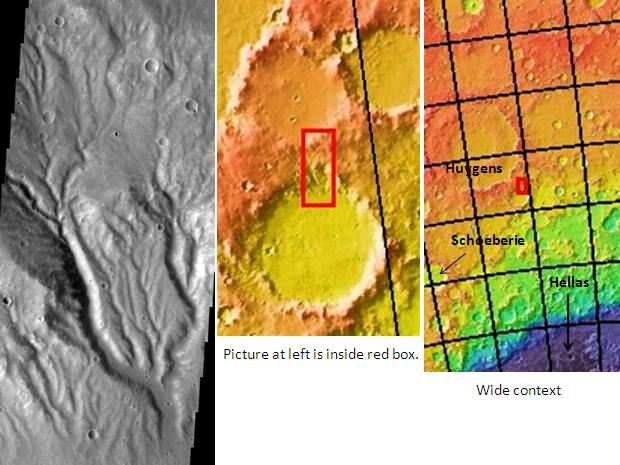
Branched valleys on the rim of Huygens crater, as seen by THEMIS.

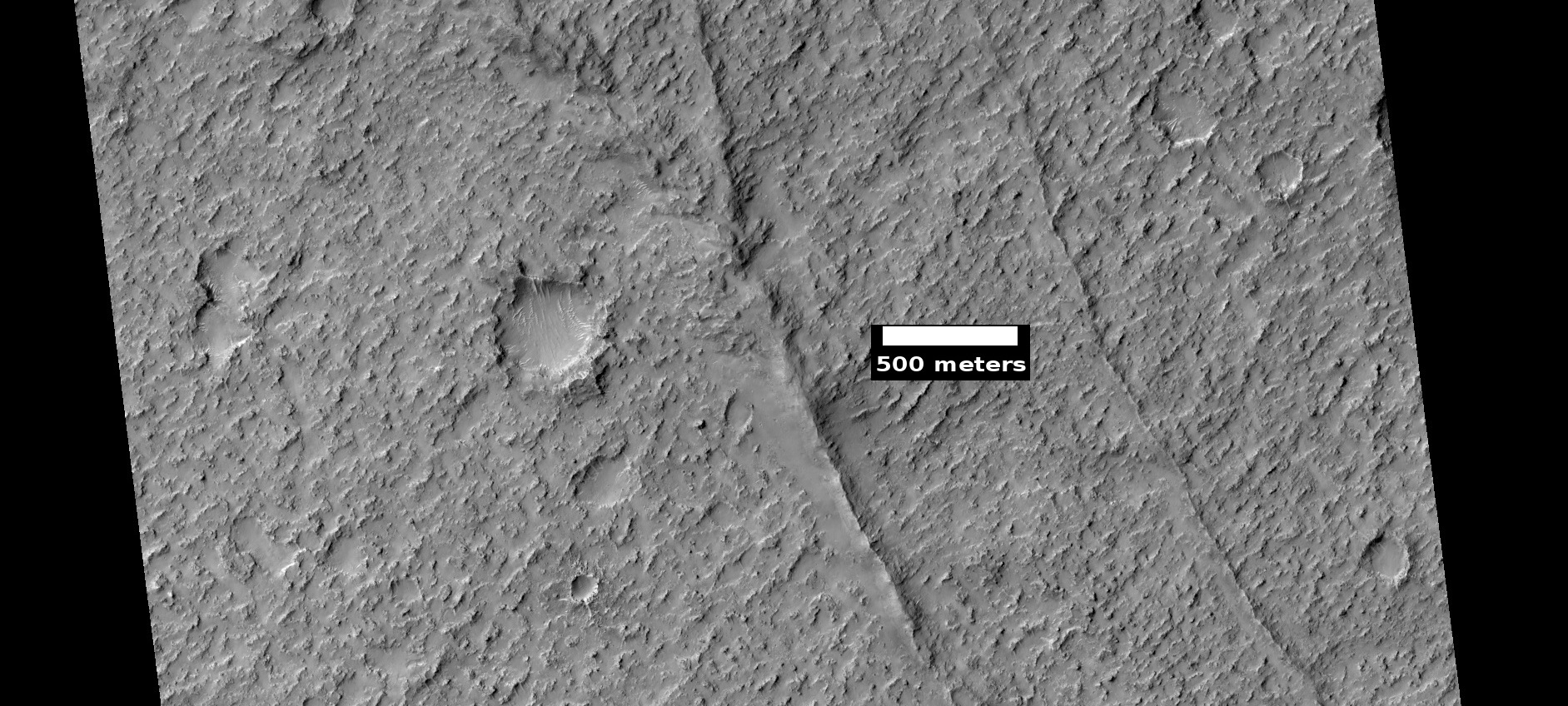
Possible dikes on floor of Huygens crater, as seen by HiRISE under the HiWish program.

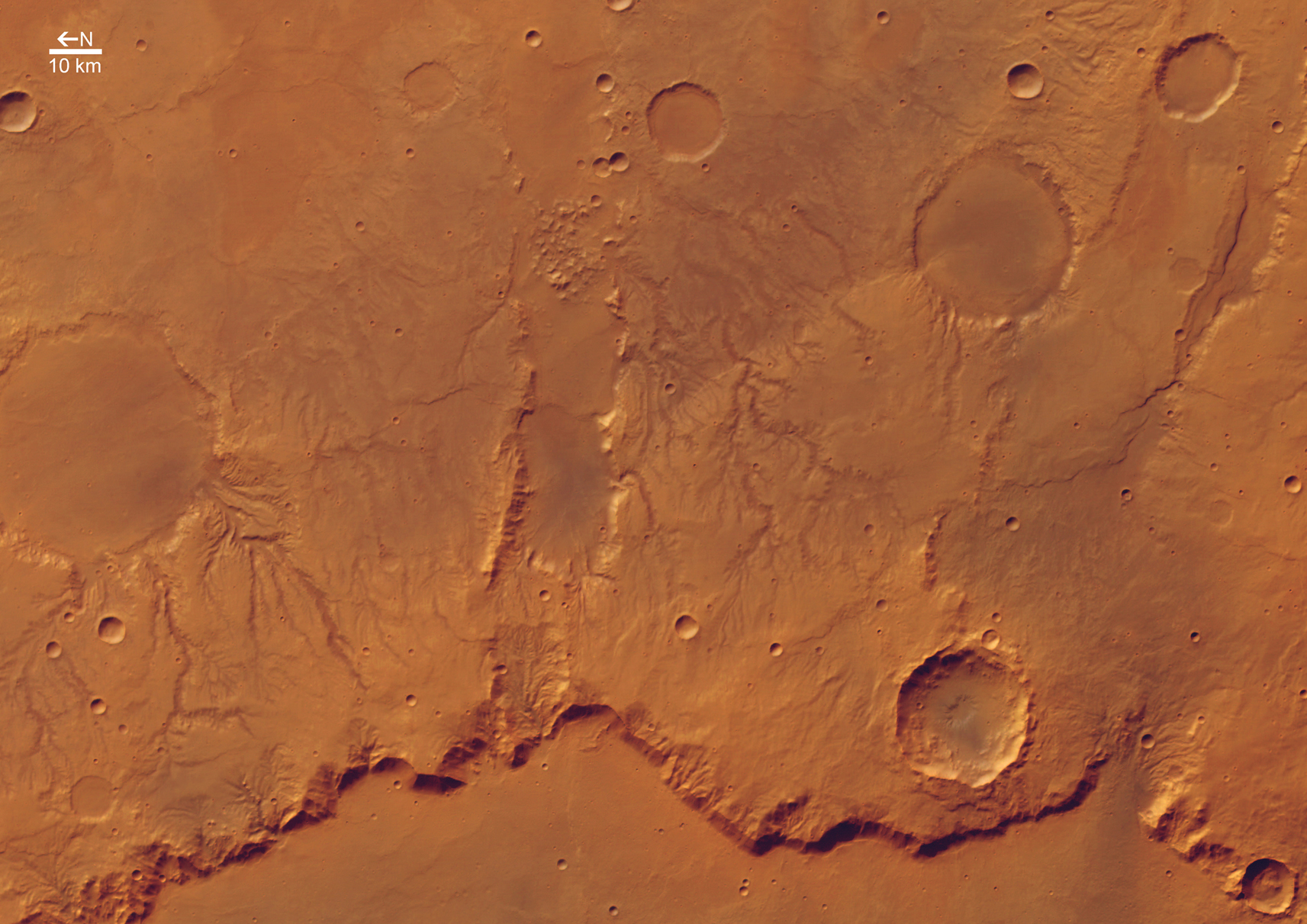
The eastern rim of Huygens with dendritic channels leading away from the rim.
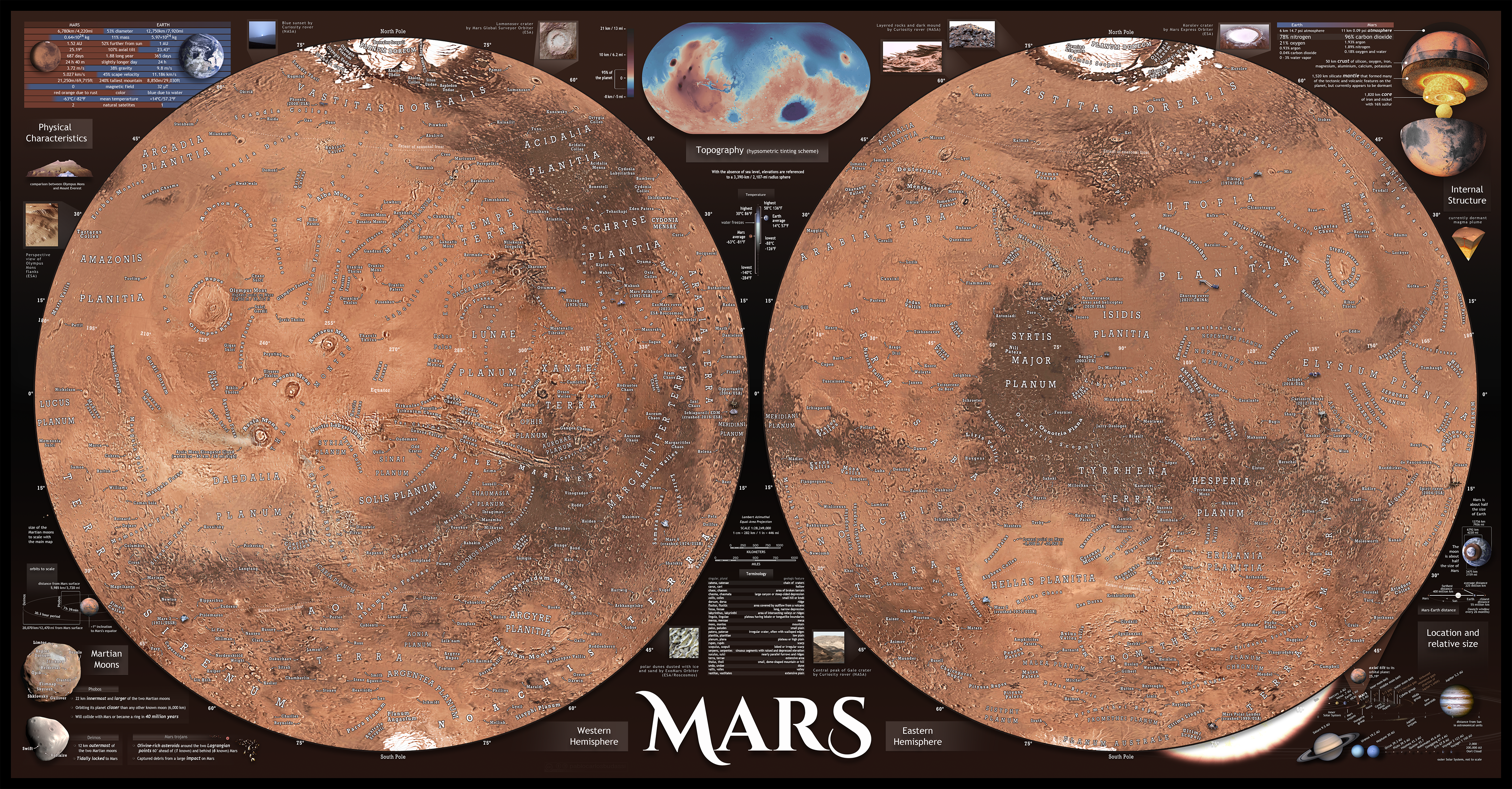
The surroundings of the Huygens crater.

== See also ==
- Climate of Mars
- Geology of Mars
- HiRISE
- HiWish program
- Hydrothermal circulation
- Impact crater
- Impact event
- List of craters on Mars
- Ore resources on Mars
- Planetary nomenclature
- Water on Mars
