= François J. Terby =

Belgian astronomer

François J. Terby (9 August 1846 – 20 March 1911) was a Belgian astronomer. He had a private observatory at Leuven, Belgium and was an early ardent advocate of the existence of Martian canals.

He collected drawings of Mars and wrote the work Aréographie in 1875. He tracked down the Mars drawings of Johann Hieronymus Schröter and deposited them at Leiden University, where they would eventually finally be published in 1881.

A crater on Mars (Terby) is named after him.
