= Iapygia quadrangle =

Map of Mars

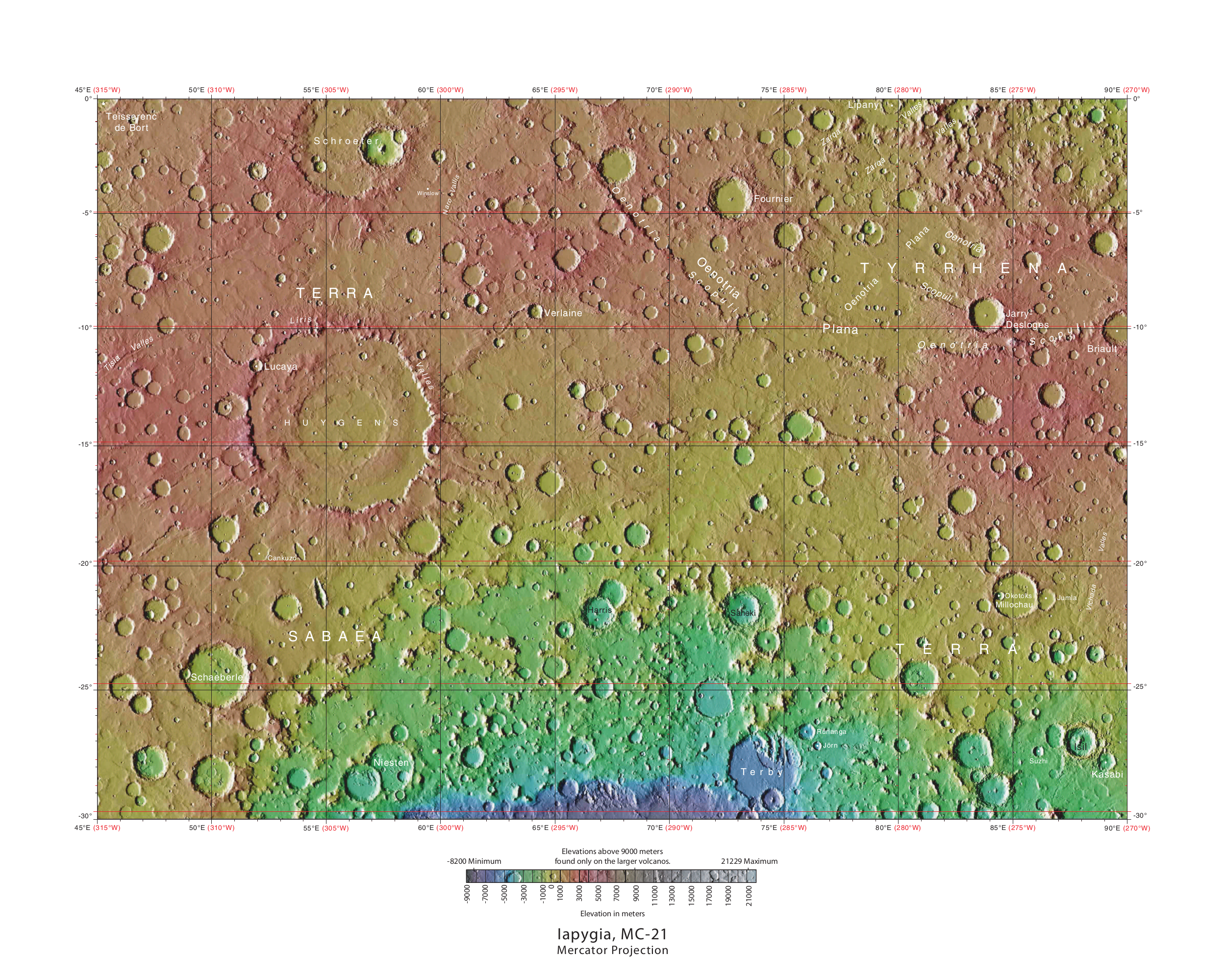
- Map of Iapygia quadrangle from Mars Orbiter Laser Altimeter (MOLA) data. The highest elevations are red and the lowest are blue. Terby (crater) contains many rock layers.
- Coordinates: 15°S 292.5°W

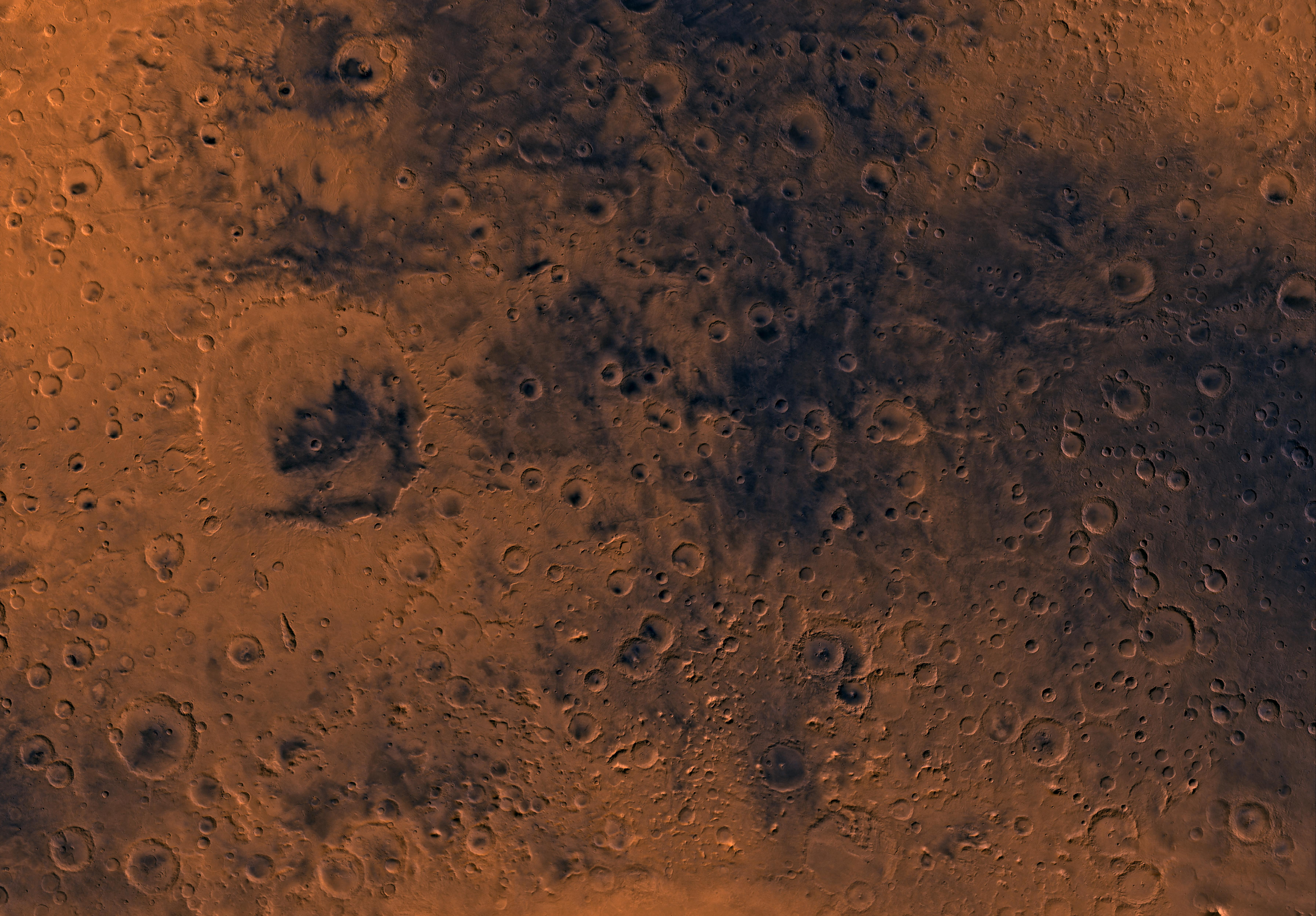
Image of the Iapygia Quadrangle (MC-21). Most of the region contains heavily cratered and dissected highlands. The west-central part contains Huygens crater. The southern one-third includes the northern rim of the Hellas basin.

The Iapygia quadrangle is one of a series of 30 quadrangle maps of Mars used by the United States Geological Survey (USGS) Astrogeology Research Program. The Iapygia quadrangle is also referred to as MC-21 (Mars Chart-21). It was named after the heel of the boot of Italy. That name was given by the Greeks It is part of a region of Italy named Apulia. The name Iapygia was approved in 1958.

The Iapygia quadrangle covers the area from 270° to 315° west longitude and from 0° to 30° south latitude on Mars. Parts of the regions Tyrrhena Terra and Terra Sabaea are found in this quadrangle. The largest crater in this quadrangle is Huygens. Some interesting features in this quadrangle are dikes. the many layers found in Terby crater, and the presence of carbonates on the rim of Huygens crater.

== Dikes ==
Near Huygens, especially just to the east of it, are a number of narrow ridges which appear to be the remnants of dikes, like the ones around Shiprock, New Mexico. The dikes were once under the surface, but have now been eroded. Dikes are magma-filled cracks that often carry lava to the surface. Dikes by definition cut across rock layers. Some dikes on earth are associated with mineral deposits. Discovering dikes on Mars means that perhaps future colonists will be able to mine needed minerals on Mars, instead of transporting them all the way from the Earth.

Some features look like dikes, but may be what has been called linear ridge networks. Ridges often appear as mostly straight segments that intersect in a lattice-like manner. They are hundreds of meters long, tens of meters high, and several meters wide. It is thought that impacts created fractures in the surface; these fractures later acted as channels for fluids. Fluids cemented the structures. With the passage of time, surrounding material was eroded away, thereby leaving hard ridges behind. Since the ridges occur in locations with clay, these formations could serve as a marker for clay which requires water for its formation. Water here could have supported life.

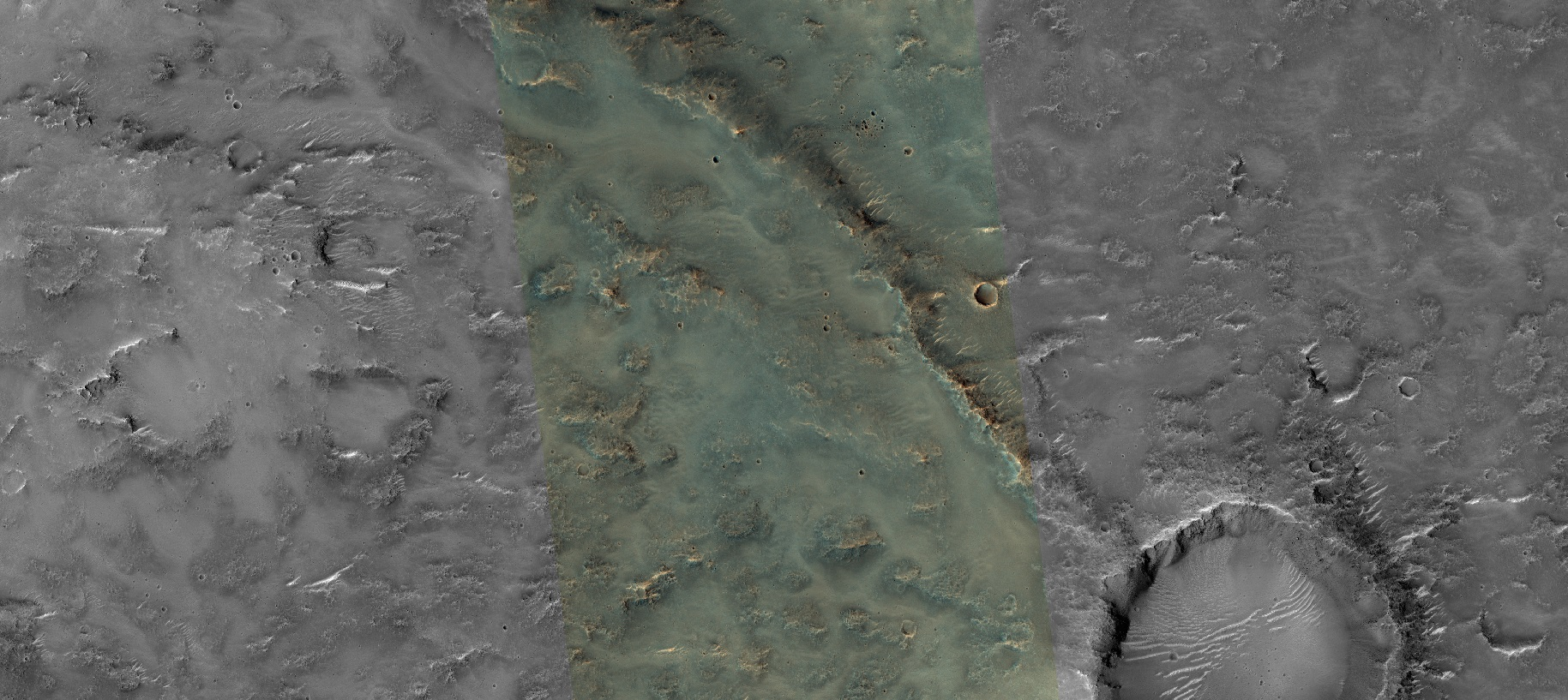
Close view of dike near the crater Huygens, as seen by HiRISE

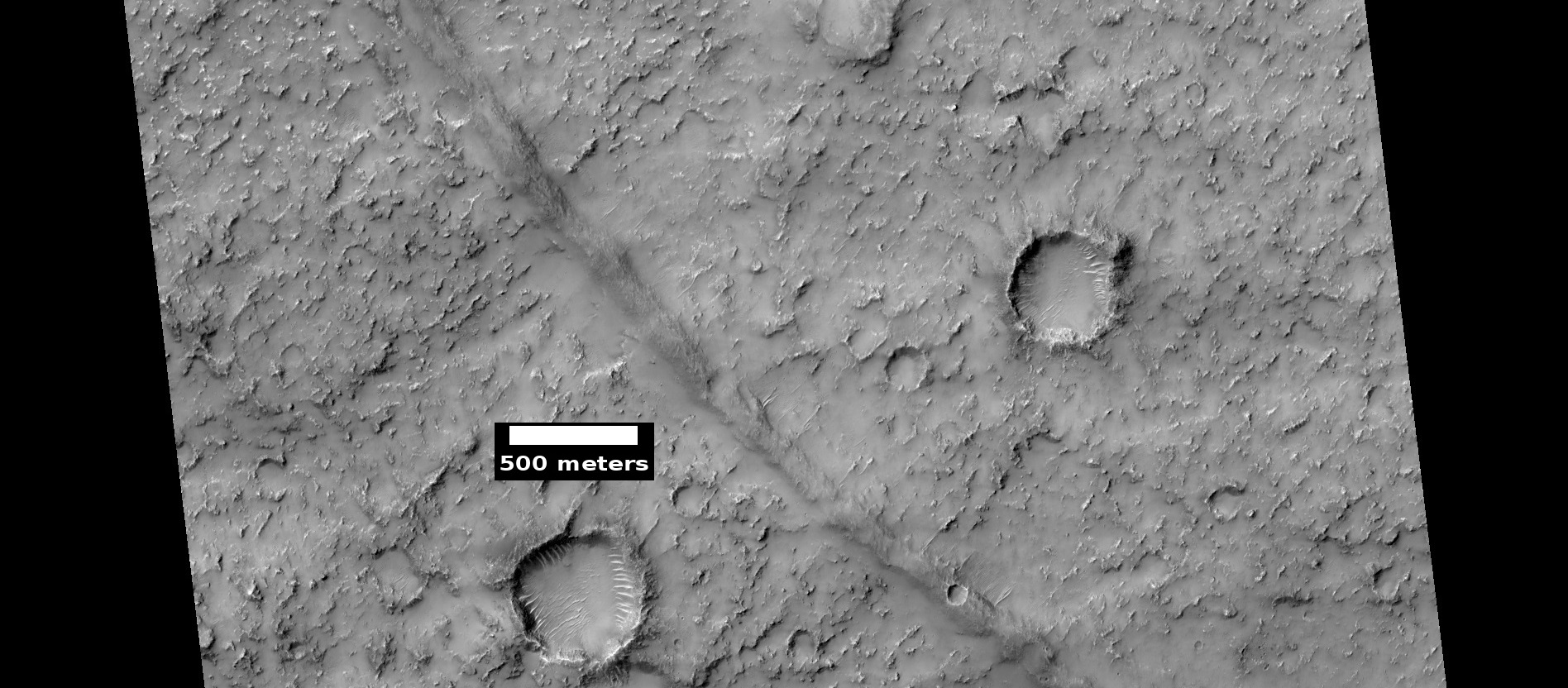
Possible dike, as seen by HiRISE under HiWish program

== Layers ==
Many places on Mars show rocks arranged in layers. Rock can form layers in a variety of ways. Volcanoes, wind, or water can produce layers. A detailed discussion of layering with many Martian examples can be found in Sedimentary Geology of Mars. Layers can be hardened by the action of groundwater. Martian ground water probably moved hundreds of kilometers, and in the process it dissolved many minerals from the rock it passed through. When ground water surfaces in low areas containing sediments, water evaporates in the thin atmosphere and leaves behind minerals as deposits and/or cementing agents. Consequently, layers of dust could not later easily erode away since they were cemented together.

== Craters ==
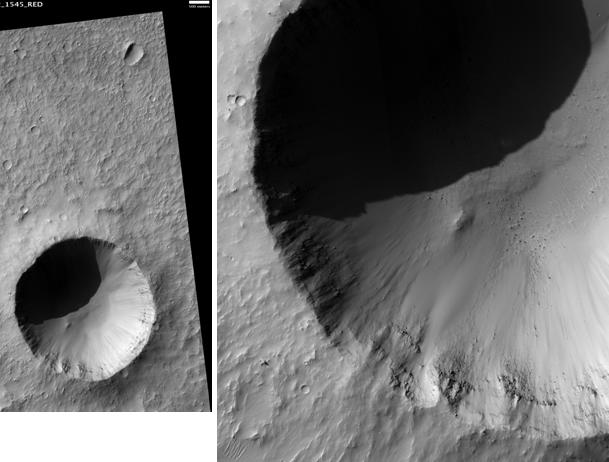
Small crater in Schaeberle Crater, as seen by HiRISE. Image on right is an enlargement of the other image. Scale bar is 500 meters long.

Impact craters generally have a rim with ejecta around them, in contrast volcanic craters usually do not have a rim or ejecta deposits. Sometimes craters will display layers. Since the collision that produces a crater is like a powerful explosion, rocks from deep underground are tossed unto the surface. Hence, craters can show us what lies deep under the surface.

== Carbonates ==
Carbonates (calcium or iron carbonates) were discovered in a crater on the rim of Huygens Crater. The impact on the rim exposed material that had been dug up from the impact that created Huygens. These minerals represent evidence that Mars once had a thicker carbon dioxide atmosphere with abundant moisture. These kinds of carbonates only form when there is a lot of water. They were found with the Compact Reconnaissance Imaging Spectrometer for Mars (CRISM) instrument on the Mars Reconnaissance Orbiter. Earlier, the instrument had detected clay minerals. The carbonates were found near the clay minerals. Both of these minerals form in wet environments. It is supposed that billions of years age Mars was much warmer and wetter. At that time, carbonates would have formed from water and the carbon dioxide-rich atmosphere. Later the deposits of carbonate would have been buried. The double impact has now exposed the minerals. Earth has vast carbonate deposits in the form of limestone.

== Evidence of rivers ==
There is enormous evidence that water once flowed in river valleys on Mars. Images of curved channels have been seen in images from Mars spacecraft dating back to the early 1970s with the Mariner 9 orbiter. Vallis (plural valles) is the Latin word for valley. It is used in planetary geology for the naming of landform features on other planets, including what could be old river valleys that were discovered on Mars, when probes were first sent to Mars. The Viking Orbiters caused a revolution in our ideas about water on Mars; huge river valleys were found in many areas. Space craft cameras showed that floods of water broke through dams, carved deep valleys, eroded grooves into bedrock, and traveled thousands of kilometers. Some valles on Mars (Mangala Vallis, Athabasca Vallis, Granicus Vallis, and Tinjar Valles) clearly begin at graben. On the other hand, some of the large outflow channels begin in rubble-filled low areas called chaos or chaotic terrain. It has been suggested that massive amounts of water were trapped under pressure beneath a thick cryosphere (layer of frozen ground), then the water was suddenly released, perhaps when the cryosphere was broken by a fault.

== Dunes ==
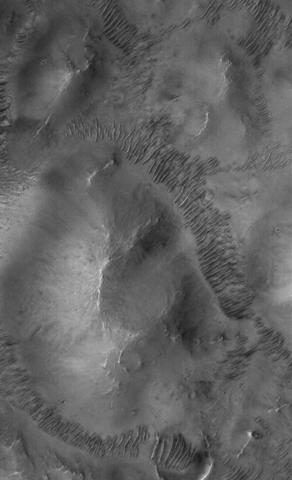
Sand dunes often form in low areas (Mars Global Surveyor)

The Iapygia quadrangle contains some dunes. Some of them are barchans. Pictures below show sand dunes in this quadrangle. When there are perfect conditions for producing sand dunes, steady wind in one direction and just enough sand, a barchan sand dune forms. Barchans have a gentle slope on the wind side and a much steeper slope on the lee side where horns or a notch often forms. The whole dune may appear to move with the wind. Observing dunes on Mars can tell us how strong the winds are, as well as their direction. If pictures are taken at regular intervals, one may see changes in the dunes or possibly in ripples on the dune's surface. On Mars dunes are often dark in color because they were formed from the common, volcanic rock basalt. In the dry environment, dark minerals in basalt, like olivine and pyroxene, do not break down as they do on Earth. Although rare, some dark sand is found on Hawaii which also has many volcanoes discharging basalt. Barchan is a Russian term because this type of dune was first seen in the desert regions of Turkistan. Some of the wind on Mars is created when the dry ice at the poles is heated in the spring. At that time, the solid carbon dioxide (dry ice) sublimates or changes directly to a gas and rushes away at high speeds. Each Martian year 30% of the carbon dioxide in the atmosphere freezes out and covers the pole that is experiencing winter, so there is a great potential for strong winds.

== See also ==
- Barchan
- Carbonates on Mars
- Climate of Mars
- Compact Reconnaissance Imaging Spectrometer for Mars
- Geology of Mars
- Groundwater on Mars
- HiRISE
- Huygens (crater)
- Impact crater
- List of quadrangles on Mars
- Martian Craters
- Martian Gullies
- Valley networks (Mars)
- Water on Mars

MC-01 Mare Boreum (features)
MC-02 Diacria (features)		MC-03 Arcadia (features)	MC-04 Acidalium (features)	MC-05 Ismenius Lacus (features)		MC-06 Casius (features)	MC-07 Cebrenia (features)
MC-08 Amazonis (features)	MC-09 Tharsis (features)	MC-10 Lunae Palus (features)	MC-11 Oxia Palus (features)	MC-12 Arabia (features)	MC-13 Syrtis Major (features)	MC-14 Amenthes (features)	MC-15 Elysium (features)
MC-16 Memnonia (features)	MC-17 Phoenicis Lacus (features)	MC-18 Coprates (features)	MC-19 Margaritifer Sinus (features)	MC-20 Sinus Sabaeus (features)	MC-21 Iapygia (features)	MC-22 Mare Tyrrhenum (features)	MC-23 Aeolis (features)
MC-24 Phaethontis (features)		MC-25 Thaumasia (features)	MC-26 Argyre (features)	MC-27 Noachis (features)		MC-28 Hellas (features)	MC-29 Eridania (features)
MC-30 Mare Australe (features)
