= Norman Horowitz =

American geneticist

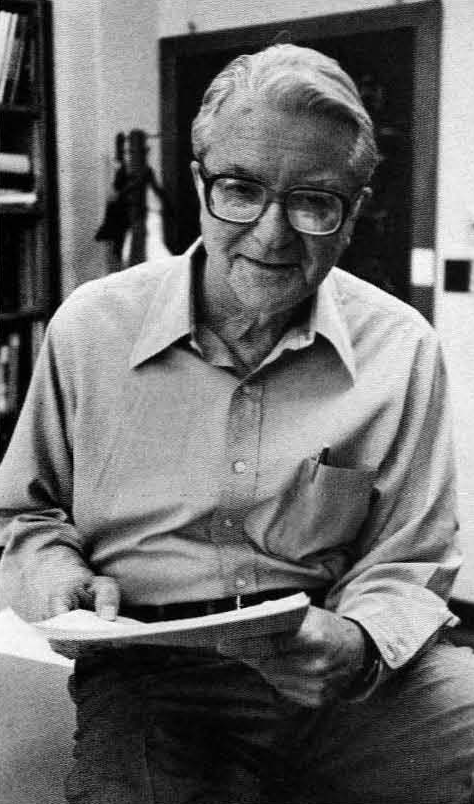
- Horowitz in 1986
- Born: March 19, 1915
- Died: June 1, 2005 (aged 90)
- Education: University of Pittsburgh, Caltech (Ph.D. 1939)
- Known for: Devising experiments to test for life on Mars.
- Scientific career
- Institutions: Jet Propulsion Laboratory, Pasadena; Caltech
- Doctoral advisor: Albert Tyler
- Other academic advisors: George W. Beadle

Norman Harold Horowitz (March 19, 1915 – June 1, 2005) was an American geneticist at Caltech who achieved national fame as the scientist who devised experiments to determine whether life might exist on Mars. His experiments were carried out by the Viking Lander of 1976, the first U.S. mission to successfully land an unmanned probe on the surface of Mars.

Horowitz was a member of both the National Academy of Sciences and the American Academy of Arts and Sciences. In 1965 he began work with the Jet Propulsion Laboratory in Pasadena, serving for five years as chief of JPL's bioscience section and as a member of the science teams for the Mariner and Viking missions to Mars. From 1977 to 1980, he was chairman of the biology division at Caltech.

Since 2013, Horowitz was listed on the Advisory Council of the National Center for Science Education.

Among advocates of space exploration, he was noted for his opposition to a space program centered on the use of human astronauts. Charlene Anderson recalls, "In personal discussions, he could be particularly vociferous on the topic of human versus robotic exploration. Norm argued that human exploration could only interfere with scientific exploration and confuse the public as to why we should explore space. In his view, science should drive the endeavor, not a lust for adventure."

== Scientific career ==
Horowitz earned his BS in biology at the University of Pittsburgh in 1936 where his experience conducting research as an undergraduate helped to persuade him to pursue further graduate training in science. He later established the endowed Norman H. Horowitz Fellowship at the University of Pittsburgh to support undergraduate research. He completed his PhD at Caltech in 1939 under embryologist Albert Tyler, and then became a postdoctoral researcher at Stanford University in the laboratory of George W. Beadle. Horowitz returned to Caltech as a faculty member in 1946 and stayed at the Institute for the remainder of his career. He served as chair of the Biology Division from 1977 to 1980, and became professor emeritus in 1982.

As a scientist, Horowitz is best known for his discovery and demonstration in 1944 that a metabolic pathway is a series of steps, each catalyzed by a single enzyme. Working with Neurospora crassa, Horowitz demonstrated that each step in the metabolism of arginine from its precursors depends on the intactness of a single gene. His discovery helped to clinch the case for George Beadle and Edward Tatum's "one gene-one enzyme hypothesis" (a term Horowitz coined for their concept).

The importance of the “one gene-one enzyme” concept can only be understood in the context of how geneticists thought about the gene in the first half of the twentieth century. Many geneticists doubted that genes, as definable entities even existed. Rather they attributed the phenotypes of mutants to altered properties of whole chromosomes. Even among geneticists who believed in the existence of individual genes, a vague concern was often expressed that there was no simple causative relationship between genes and proteins. Metzenberg remarked on the stubborn courage required for Horowitz to espouse and defend the initially unpopular idea of “one gene-one enzyme” and to see it through to general acceptance.

Another important contribution of Horowitz was his 1945 proposal on the “backward evolution” of biosynthetic pathways. This proposal provided a framework for understanding the evolution of biosynthetic pathways and presaged the study of molecular evolution. Horowitz proposed that the earliest life forms reproduced themselves by utilizing non-biologic organic molecules in the environment. Depletion of such organic molecules by the early reproducing life forms could have continued until a point was reached where the supply of one of these molecules limited further multiplication. By a process of mutation and natural selection, these life forms then evolved a catalytic activity for utilizing another related available molecule by catalyzing its conversion to the previously limiting molecule. When this precursor molecule was in turn eventually depleted, further mutations allowed the conversion of another available substrate (a pre- precursor) into the precursor. Horowitz considered that repetition of such mutation/selection events formed the basis of the evolution of biosynthetic pathways.

Horowitz was head of the Pyrolytic Release experiment during the Viking program.

Dr Beadle (1958 Nobel Prize winner in Medicine) gave credit to Dr. Horowitz for his original work on biological reactions.

Norman Horowitz was the head of the Jet Propulsion Laboratory's bioscience section for the first U.S. mission, Viking Lander of 1976, to successfully land an unmanned probe on the surface of Mars. He considered that the great versatility of the carbon atom makes it the element most likely to provide solutions, even exotic solutions, to the problems of survival on other planets. However, the results of this mission indicated that Mars was presently extremely hostile to carbon-based life. He also considered that, in general, there was only a remote possibility that non-carbon life forms would be able to evolve with genetic information systems capable of self-replication and adaptation.

The results from incubating Martian soil with complex media, and from pyrolysis of soil followed by gas chromatography and mass spectrometry of the pyrolysis products, suggested that the surface of Mars is lifeless. Furthermore, in the soil samples analyzed by the Viking program there were no detectable biochemical footprints in the form of organic compounds that might be expected if living organisms ever thrived on Mars. However, in 2013, NASA's Curiosity rover provided evidence of an ancient Martian lake (in existence about 3.7 billion years ago) that may have been capable of supporting life for long stretches --- perhaps for millions of years. Thus, although Horowitz's pyrolytic release experiments in 1976 provided the first indication that there is no current life on the surface of Mars, it remains possible that life did exist on Mars in the distant past.

== See also ==
- One gene-one enzyme hypothesis
