= Silicon Photonics Link =

- Type: Computer Hardware Bus

Production history
- Designer: Intel Corporation
- Manufacturer: Intel Corporation

Data
- Data signal: Yes
- Bitrate: 50 Gbit/s

Silicon Photonics Link is a silicon-based optical data connection developed by Intel Corporation which uses silicon photonics and hybrid silicon laser, it provides 50 Gbit/s bandwidth. Intel expected the technology to be in products by 2015.

This technology is enabled and well supported by academic and industrial research work at Intel labs, 50 Gbit/s multi-color transmission line at Cornell University and Columbia University.

== See also ==
- List of device bandwidths
- Thunderbolt (Light Peak)
- Universal Serial Bus (USB)
