= Aaron Hawkins =

Aaron Hawkins may refer to:

- Aaron Hawkins (engineer) (born 1970), American engineer
- Aaron Hawkins (politician) (born 1983/1984), mayor of Dunedin City in Otago, New Zealand
