= Albert Tyler =

Albert Tyler may refer to:

- Albert Tyler (biologist) (1906–1968), American reproductive biologist
- Albert Tyler (athlete) (1872–1945), American athlete
