= Aaron Hawkins (engineer) =

American engineer (born 1970)

- Born: February 26, 1970 (age 56); Rehoboth, New Mexico
- Education: University of California, Santa Barbara (PhD); California Institute of Technology (B.S.)
- Scientific career
- Workplaces: Brigham Young University
- Thesis: Silicon-Indium-Gallium-Arsenide Avalanche Photodetectors (1998)
- Doctoral advisor: John E. Bowers
- Website: https://hawkins.byu.edu

Aaron Roe Hawkins (born February 26, 1970) is an American engineer known for his work in optofluidics. He is a professor and chair in the department of electrical and computer engineering at Brigham Young University.

== Education and career ==
Hawkins was born in Rehoboth, New Mexico. He received his B.S. degree from the California Institute of Technology in applied physics in 1994, and went on to the University of California, Santa Barbara for his Ph.D. in electrical and computer engineering, which he completed in 1998. His dissertation, Silicon-Indium-Gallium-Arsenide Avalanche Photodetectors, was supervised by John E. Bowers. He held several jobs in industry before moving to Brigham Young in 2002.

He is a past Editor-in-Chief of the IEEE Journal of Quantum Electronics.

== Research ==
One of the research projects led by Hawkins developed optofluidic single-chip devices for rapid diagnosis of antibiotic resistance in bacterial infections. These devices operate on a sample of the bacteria causing the infection by attaching fluorescent markers to the genes for antibiotic resistance in DNA from the sample, using a laser to illuminate the marked samples, and scanning the resulting fluorescence to detect whether the genes are present. In their work on this project, Hawkins's team discovered that a layer of matte black nail polish with openings in specified locations could be used to make an effective light guide.

As well as his work on optofluidics, Hawkins has contributed his expertise to the Biological Oxidant and Life Detection proposed Mars landing mission, working on a mass spectrometry device to measure the size and electrostatic properties of Martian dust.

== Books ==
With Stephen Schultz, Hawkins is the author of the textbook Practically Magic: A Guide to Electrical and Computer Engineering (Kendall Hunt Publishing, 2013). Hawkins coedited the Handbook of Optofluidics (CRC Press, 2017) with Holger Schmidt.

Hawkins is also the author of a children's book, The Year Money Grew On Trees. The book, based on Hawkins' childhood in New Mexico, follows a thirteen-year-old who agrees to work the apple orchard of his neighbor.

== Short stories ==
Aaron Hawkin's current project is a series of short stories called 500 Ironic Stories. They are available to be read for free or listened to on many podcast platforms.

== Awards and honors ==
Hawkins was elected a Fellow of the Optical Society in 2015 for "developments in optical communications photodiodes and receivers, specifically wafer-fused photodiodes, and for contributions in the field of optofluidics, especially hollow-core waveguide-based analysis platforms." He was named as a Fellow of the Institute of Electrical and Electronics Engineers (IEEE) in 2016 "for contributions to optofluidics."

In 2019 he received the IEEE Photonics Society Engineering Achievement Award, jointly with his collaborator, Holger Schmidt of UC Santa Cruz, "for the invention and development of optofluidic waveguides and their applications, in particular commercialization for biomedical diagnostics."
