= Gordon S. Kino =

Australian-born British-American inventor and professor

Gordon Stanley Kino
- Born: June 15, 1928; Melbourne, Australia
- Died: October 9, 2017 (aged 89); Stanford, California, U.S.
- Education: University of London; Stanford University
- Scientific career
- Fields: Electrical engineering
- Workplaces: Bell Labs; Stanford University
- Thesis: Perturbation theory of transmission systems (1955)
- Doctoral advisor: Marvin Chodorow
- Doctoral students: John E. Bowers; Peter T. Kirstein; Miklos Porkolab; Aydogan Ozcan

Gordon Stanley Kino (June 15, 1928 – October 9, 2017) was an Australian-born British-American inventor and professor of electrical engineering and applied physics at Stanford University. He is known for "inventing new microscopes that improved semiconductor manufacturing and transformed medical diagnostics." His dual-axis confocal microscope has several advantages over the single-axis confocal microscope.

== Biography ==
Born in Australia, Kino grew up in London. He obtained B.Sc. and M.Sc. degrees in mathematics from University of London in 1952 and 1954, respectively. He pursued his doctoral studies at Stanford University under the supervision of Marvin Chodorow, graduating in 1955 with a Ph.D. in electrical engineering. His dissertation was titled as Perturbation theory of transmission systems. In October 1955 in San Francisco, Gordon Kino married Dorothy Beryl Lovelace, who was a former Londoner that he met in California. Their daughter, Carol Ann Kino, was born in December 1956. From 1956 to 1957 he worked at Bell Labs in Murray Hill, New Jersey. At Stanford University he held a research position from 1957 to 1961, joined the faculty of the department of electrical engineering in 1961, and was promoted to full professor in 1965, officially retiring as professor emeritus in 1997. He became in 1967 a naturalized U.S. citizen and for the academic year 1967–1968 held a Guggenheim fellowship.

Kino is credited with at least 119 U.S. patents. He did research on "microwave triodes, traveling wave tubes, klystrons, microwave tubes, magnetrons, electron guns, wave propagation in plasmas, solid-state oscillators and amplifiers, microwave acoustics, and acoustic imaging devices for medical instrumentation and nondestructive testing." His research helped in the 1990s to greatly improve data storage. At Stanford he was one the pioneers of interdisciplinary research and development for technological innovation. Along with Calvin Quate and Herbert John Shaw, he was one of the most important members of Stanford's Ginzton Laboratory and its director from 1994 to 1996. Kino was the author or co-author of over 400 technical articles.

Among Kino's papers stored at Stanford University, there is a photograph album of Kino's 1997 retirement party.

He was the advisor or co-advisor for more than 70 doctoral dissertations. His doctoral students include John E. Bowers, Peter T. Kirstein, and Miklos Porkolab.

Kino was elected in 1976 a member of the National Academy of Engineering. He was elected a fellow of the Institute of Electrical and Electronics Engineers, of the American Physical Society, and of the American Association for the Advancement of Science.

In the last years of his life, Kino suffered from Parkinson's disease. Upon his death in 2017 he was survived by his widow and their daughter.

== Selected publications ==
=== Articles ===
- Ruch, J. G.; Kino, G. S. (1968). "Transport Properties of GaAs". Physical Review. 174 (3): 921–931. Bibcode:1968PhRv..174..921R. doi:10.1103/PhysRev.174.921.
- Kino, Gordon S.; Shaw, John (1972). "Acoustic Surface Waves". Scientific American. 227 (4): 50–69. Bibcode:1972SciAm.227d..50K. doi:10.1038/scientificamerican1072-50. JSTOR 24922891.
- "Development of surface acoustic wave devices by Gordon S. Kino and H. J. Shaw". Science, Technology, and the Modern Navy: Thirtieth Anniversary, 1946-1976. Department of the Navy, Office of Naval Research. 1976. pp. 41–64.
- Kompfner, Rudolf; Kino, Gordon S. (April 1978). "Acoustic scanning reflection-type microscope (Navy Case No. 60,127)". Navy Technical Disclosure Bulletin. 3 (4): 5–10.
- Desilets, C.S.; Fraser, J.D.; Kino, G.S. (1978). "The design of efficient broad-band piezoelectric transducers". IEEE Transactions on Sonics and Ultrasonics. 25 (3): 115–125. doi:10.1109/T-SU.1978.31001.
- Stanke, Fred E.; Kino, G. S. (1984). "A unified theory for elastic wave propagation in polycrystalline materials". The Journal of the Acoustical Society of America. 75 (3): 665–681. Bibcode:1984ASAJ...75..665S. doi:10.1121/1.390577.
- Mansfield, S. M.; Kino, G. S. (1990). "Solid immersion microscope". Applied Physics Letters. 57 (24): 2615–2616. Bibcode:1990ApPhL..57.2615M. doi:10.1063/1.103828. (over 900 citations)
- Kino, Gordon S.; Chim, Stanley S. C. (1990). "Mirau correlation microscope". Applied Optics. 29 (26): 3775–3783. Bibcode:1990ApOpt..29.3775K. doi:10.1364/AO.29.003775. PMID 20567483.
- Wu, X. D.; Kino, G. S.; Fanton, J. T.; Kapitulnik, A. (1993). "Photothermal microscope for high-T_{c} superconductors and charge density waves". Review of Scientific Instruments. 64 (11): 3321–3327. Bibcode:1993RScI...64.3321W. doi:10.1063/1.1144298.
- Terris, B. D.; Mamin, H. J.; Rugar, D.; Studenmund, W. R.; Kino, G. S. (1994). "Near-field optical data storage using a solid immersion lens". Applied Physics Letters. 65 (4): 388–390. Bibcode:1994ApPhL..65..388T. doi:10.1063/1.112341.
- Savin, S.; Digonnet, M. J. F.; Kino, G. S.; Shaw, H. J. (2000). "Tunable mechanically induced long-period fiber gratings". Optics Letters. 25 (10): 710–712. Bibcode:2000OptL...25..710S. doi:10.1364/OL.25.000710. PMID 18064159.
- Crozier, K. B.; Sundaramurthy, A.; Kino, G. S.; Quate, C. F. (2003). "Optical antennas: Resonators for local field enhancement". Journal of Applied Physics. 94 (7): 4632–4642. Bibcode:2003JAP....94.4632C. doi:10.1063/1.1602956.
- Fromm, D. P.; Sundaramurthy, A.; Schuck, P. J.; Kino, G.; Moerner, W. E. (2004). "Gap-dependent optical coupling of single "bowtie" nanoantennas resonant in the visible". Nano Letters. 4 (5): 957–961. Bibcode:2004NanoL...4..957F. doi:10.1021/nl049951r. (over 750 citations)
- Schuck, P. J.; Fromm, D. P.; Sundaramurthy, A.; Kino, G. S.; Moerner, W. E. (2005). "Improving the Mismatch between Light and Nanoscale Objects with Gold Bowtie Nanoantennas". Physical Review Letters. 94 (1) 017402. Bibcode:2005PhRvL..94a7402S. doi:10.1103/PhysRevLett.94.017402. PMID 15698131. (over 1200 citations)
- Sundaramurthy, Arvind; Crozier, K. B.; Kino, G. S.; Fromm, D. P.; Schuck, P. J.; Moerner, W. E. (2005). "Field enhancement and gap-dependent resonance in a system of two opposing tip-to-tip Au nanotriangles". Physical Review B. 72 (16) 165409. Bibcode:2005PhRvB..72p5409S. doi:10.1103/PhysRevB.72.165409.
- Sundaramurthy, Arvind; Schuck, P. James; Conley, Nicholas R.; Fromm, David P.; Kino, Gordon S.; Moerner, W. E. (2006). "Toward Nanometer-Scale Optical Photolithography: Utilizing the Near-Field of Bowtie Optical Nanoantennas". Nano Letters. 6 (3): 355–360. Bibcode:2006NanoL...6..355S. doi:10.1021/nl052322c. PMC 1447673. PMID 16522022.
- Fromm, David P.; Sundaramurthy, Arvind; Kinkhabwala, Anika; Schuck, P. James; Kino, Gordon S.; Moerner, W. E. (2006). "Exploring the chemical enhancement for surface-enhanced Raman scattering with Au bowtie nanoantennas". The Journal of Chemical Physics. 124 (6): 061101. Bibcode:2006JChPh.124f1101F. doi:10.1063/1.2167649. PMC 1513182. PMID 16483189.
- Gonzalez-Gonzalez, E.; Ra, H.; Hickerson, R. P.; Wang, Q.; Piyawattanametha, W.; Mandella, M. J.; Kino, G. S.; Leake, D.; Avilion, A. A.; Solgaard, O.; Doyle, T. C.; Contag, C. H.; Kaspar, R. L. (2009). "SiRNA silencing of keratinocyte-specific GFP expression in a transgenic mouse skin model". Gene Therapy. 16 (8): 963–972. doi:10.1038/gt.2009.62. PMID 19474811. S2CID 8524073.

=== Books ===
- Kirstein, Peter T.; Kino, Gordon S.; Waters, William E. (1967). Space-charge Flow. McGraw-Hill. ASIN B0006BO3FQ.
- Kino, Gordon S. (1987). Acoustic Waves: Devices, Imaging, and Analog Signal Processing. Prentice-Hall. ISBN 0-13-003047-3.
- Kino, Gordon S.; Corle, Timothy R. (18 September 1996). Confocal Scanning Optical Microscopy and Related Imaging Systems. Academic Press. ISBN 978-0-08-052978-3.
