= John E. Bowers =

American physicist, engineer, and researcher

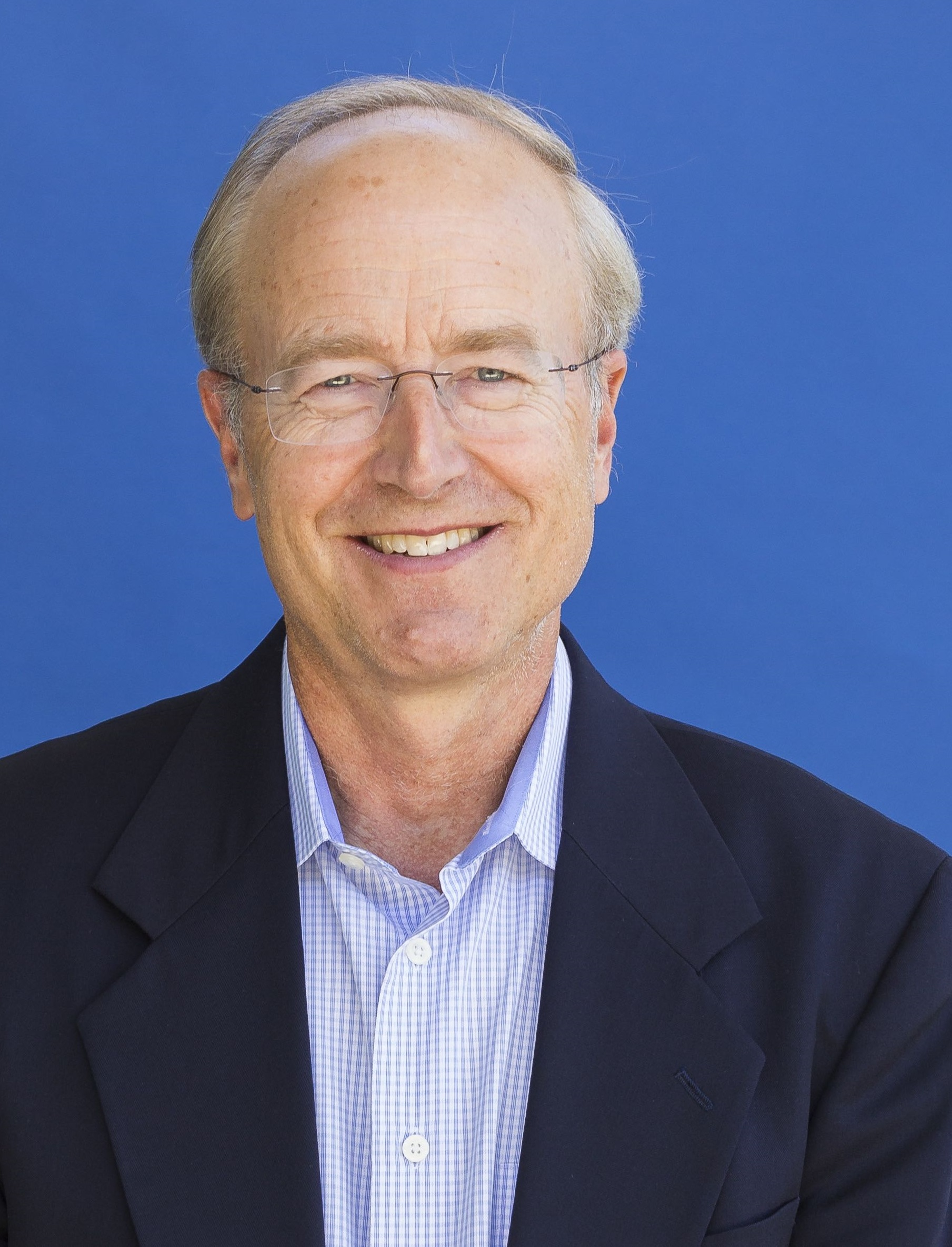
- Title: Fred Kavli Chair in Nanotechnology
- Parent: Charles E. Bowers
- Awards: Member of National Academy of Engineering; Fellow of the IEEE; Fellow of The Optical Society; Fellow of the American Physical Society

Academic background
- Education: B.S., Physics (1976); M.S., Applied Physics (1978); Ph.D., Applied Physics (1981)
- Alma mater: University of Minnesota; Stanford University
- Thesis: Broadband monolithic Sezawa wave storage correlators and convolvers (1981)
- Doctoral advisor: Gordon S. Kino

Academic work
- Institutions: University of California, Santa Barbara

John E. Bowers is an American electrical engineer and photonics researcher who is the Fred Kavli Distinguished Professor Emeritus of Electrical and Computer Engineering and Materials at the University of California, Santa Barbara (UCSB).

Bowers' research is focused on silicon photonic integrated circuits for fiber optic communications. He is a member of the National Academy of Engineering, a fellow of the IEEE, OSA, the American Physical Society, and the American Association for the Advancement to Science (AAAS).

== Education ==
Bowers received a B.S. in physics from University of Minnesota in 1976. He then received an M.S. in applied physics in 1978 and a Ph.D. in applied physics in 1981, both from Stanford University. After completing his Ph.D., he received his post-doctoral training at Ginzton Laboratory at Stanford University.

== Career ==
In 1982, Bowers joined the AT&T Bell Laboratories as a member of the technical staff.

Bowers joined the University of California, Santa Barbara, in 1987 as a professor of electrical and computer engineering. He later held appointments in materials and technology management and became a distinguished professor. He served as director of UCSB's Institute for Energy Efficiency from 2008 to 2025 and directed its Silicon Photonics Center from 2010 to 2025. In 2009, he was appointed the Fred Kavli Chair in Nanotechnology. He retired to emeritus status in 2025.

At UCSB, Bowers established research programs in silicon photonics, optoelectronic devices, and energy-efficient technologies. He also served as deputy chief executive officer of the American Institute for Manufacturing Integrated Photonics from 2015 to 2021 and was a senior visiting fellow at the Hong Kong University of Science and Technology's Institute for Advanced Study from 2018 to 2020.

Bowers has also worked in technology commercialization. He co-founded Terabit Technology, which was acquired by Ciena in 1998, and Calient Networks, where he served as chief technology officer. He later co-founded Aerius Photonics, Aurrion, Nexus Photonics, Quintessent, Qudara and other technology ventures. His work has involved transferring photonics research into technologies for optical communications and integrated circuits.

He co-founded UCSB's Technology Management Program and the nonprofit organization Unite to Light, which develops and distributes solar-powered lighting for communities with limited access to electricity.

== Research ==
Bowers' research spans silicon photonics, semiconductor lasers, photonic integrated circuits, optical communications and energy-efficient optoelectronics. His work addresses the integration of optical components with semiconductor technology to improve the speed, capacity and energy efficiency of communication and computing systems. He has also researched quantum photonics, optical switching, fiber-optic networks and semiconductor materials.

=== Silicon photonics and integrated circuits ===
A central focus of Bowers' research is silicon photonics, which uses silicon-based platforms to generate, guide, manipulate and detect light. These systems can integrate multiple optical components on a chip and are used in high-speed communications and data transmission. Silicon is well suited to large-scale manufacturing because of its established role in semiconductor fabrication, but it does not efficiently generate light. Integrating suitable light sources with silicon circuits has therefore been a major technical challenge.

Bowers and his collaborators developed hybrid silicon laser technology that combines silicon photonic structures with compound-semiconductor materials capable of producing light. Their research helped demonstrate how semiconductor lasers could be integrated with silicon-based optical circuits. In 2007, the work received the EE Times Annual Creativity in Electronics Award for Most Promising Technology. The technology also supported the development of a prototype 50-gigabit-per-second optical data link integrated onto silicon.

His research on photonic integrated circuits has examined the integration of lasers, waveguides, modulators, detectors and other optical components. Combining these devices on a common platform can reduce the need for separate optical components and simplify the design of communication systems. His work has contributed to research on using silicon photonics for optical interconnects, which transmit data between processors, computer chips and network equipment.

Bowers has also worked on heterogeneous photonic integration, in which different semiconductor materials are combined to exploit their respective optical and electronic properties. This approach enables silicon platforms to incorporate materials suited to light generation and detection. Research in this area has included integrating indium phosphide-based devices with silicon circuits and developing methods for improving the performance of integrated lasers and optical components.

=== Semiconductor lasers and optical sources ===
Bowers' work on semiconductor lasers includes high-speed lasers, hybrid silicon lasers, quantum-dot lasers and narrow-linewidth laser systems. These devices are important in optical communications, where the characteristics of the light source affect transmission speed, signal quality and energy consumption.

His research has examined the use of quantum dots as active materials in lasers integrated with silicon photonics. Quantum dots confine charge carriers in three dimensions and can offer advantages such as reduced sensitivity to certain material defects and improved performance at elevated temperatures. Integrating quantum-dot lasers with silicon-based photonic circuits is an area of research aimed at developing compact light sources for optical interconnects and other photonic applications.

Bowers has also collaborated on narrow-linewidth and low-noise semiconductor lasers. These systems combine semiconductor light sources with high-quality optical resonators to reduce fluctuations in the emitted light's frequency. Such lasers have applications in coherent optical communications, precision measurement and photonic systems that require stable optical signals. His research group has investigated resonator-based techniques for improving laser stability and reducing linewidth.

=== Optical communications and switching ===
Another area of Bowers' research is optical communication, particularly the transmission of large volumes of data through fiber-optic networks. His early work involved high-speed optoelectronic devices, lasers and photodetectors, while his later research examined the integration of these components into photonic systems.

He has studied optical switching, which directs light between different paths in a communications network. Optical switches can reduce the need to convert signals between optical and electrical forms at intermediate stages of transmission. Bowers' research on optical switching technologies has addressed the potential for improving network capacity and reducing the energy required to move data. He directed UCSB's Multidisciplinary Optical Switching Technology Center from 1996 to 2004.

His research on optical interconnects also addresses the growing demand for faster communication between computing components. As data rates increase, electrical connections can face limitations involving power consumption, signal loss and bandwidth. Photonic links offer an alternative by transmitting information through light. Bowers has investigated integrated optical devices designed to support high-speed data transmission between chips and within computing systems.

=== Energy-efficient optoelectronics ===
Bowers' research has examined ways to reduce the energy consumed by communication and computing infrastructure. Optical transmission can reduce some of the losses associated with moving data through electrical interconnects, while integrated photonic devices can reduce the number of components required in a system.

=== Quantum and nonlinear photonics ===
Bowers' research also extends to quantum and nonlinear photonics. The large nonlinearities in InGaP and AlGaAs thin films are useful for generating squeezed light and quantum key distribution. Nonlinear optical systems are also used to generate new frequencies, manipulate optical signals or produce frequency combs. These capabilities are relevant to quantum computing, high-capacity communications, precision spectroscopy and integrated photonic systems.

== Awards and honors ==
- 1988: National Science Foundation Presidential Young Investigator Award.
- 1994: Elected fellow of the Institute of Electrical and Electronics Engineers (IEEE).
- 1996 - LEOS William Streifer Award, IEEE
- 1996 - Fellow, American Physical Society
- 2001 - Entrepreneur of the Year Award, South Coast Business and Technology
- 2002 - Fellow, Optical Society of America
- 2005 - Member, National Academy of Engineering
- 2009 - Nick Holonyak, Jr. Award, Optical Society of America
- 2012 - Tyndall Award, Optical Society of America/IEEE
- 2016 - Fellow, National Academy of Inventors (NAI)
- 2017 - IEEE Photonics Award
- 2018 - Pioneer Award, South Coast Business and Technology
- 2020 - IEEE Life Fellow
- 2021 - IPRM Award
- 2022 - Fellow - American Association for the Advancement to Science (AAAS)
- 2023: Hermann Haus Award, Massachusetts Institute of Technology.
- 2024 - IEEE Jun-ichi Nishizawa Medal
- 2025 IEEE Photonics Society Distinguished Service Award
- 2025: William Gould Dow Distinguished Lectureship at the University of Michigan.
- 2026: University of California Regents Innovation Award for Distinguished Achievement.

== Selected papers ==
- Liu, A. Y.; Srinivasan, S.; Gossard, A.; Norman, J.; Bowers, J. E. (2015-10-01). "Quantum dot lasers for silicon photonics". Photonics Research (Invited paper). 3 (5): B1–B9. doi:10.1364/PRJ.3.0000B1.
- Jung, D.; Zhang, Z.; Norman, J.; Herrick, R.; Kennedy, M. J.; Patel, P.; Turnlund, K.; Jan, C.; Wan, Y.; Gossard, A.; Bowers, J. E. (2017-12-18). "Highly reliable low threshold InAs quantum dot lasers on on-axis (001) Si with 87% injection efficiency". ACS Photonics. 5 (3): 1094–1100. doi:10.1021/acsphotonics.7b01387.
- Norman, J. C.; Jung, D.; Wan, Y.; Bowers, J. E. (2018-03-27). "Perspective: The Future of Quantum Dot Photonic Integrated Circuits". APL Photonics (Invited paper). 3 (3): 030901. Bibcode:2018APLP....3c0901N. doi:10.1063/1.5021345.
- Liu, A. Y.; Bowers, J. E. (2018-07-09). "Photonic Integration with Epitaxial III-V on Silicon". IEEE Journal of Selected Topics in Quantum Electronics (Invited paper). 24 (6): 6000412. Bibcode:2018IJSTQ..2454542L. doi:10.1109/JSTQE.2018.2854542.
- Xiang, C.; Liu, J.; Guo, J.; Chang, L.; Wang, R. N.; Weng, W.; Peters, J.; Xie, W.; Zhang, Z.; Riemensberger, J.; Selvidge, J.; Kippenberg, T. J.; Bowers, J. E. (2021). "Laser soliton microcombs heterogeneously integrated on silicon". Science. 373 (6550): 99–103. arXiv:2103.02725. Bibcode:2021Sci...373...99X. doi:10.1126/science.abh2076. PMID 34210884.

== See also ==
- Hybrid silicon laser
