= Charles E. Bowers =

American civil engineer and researcher (1919–2008)

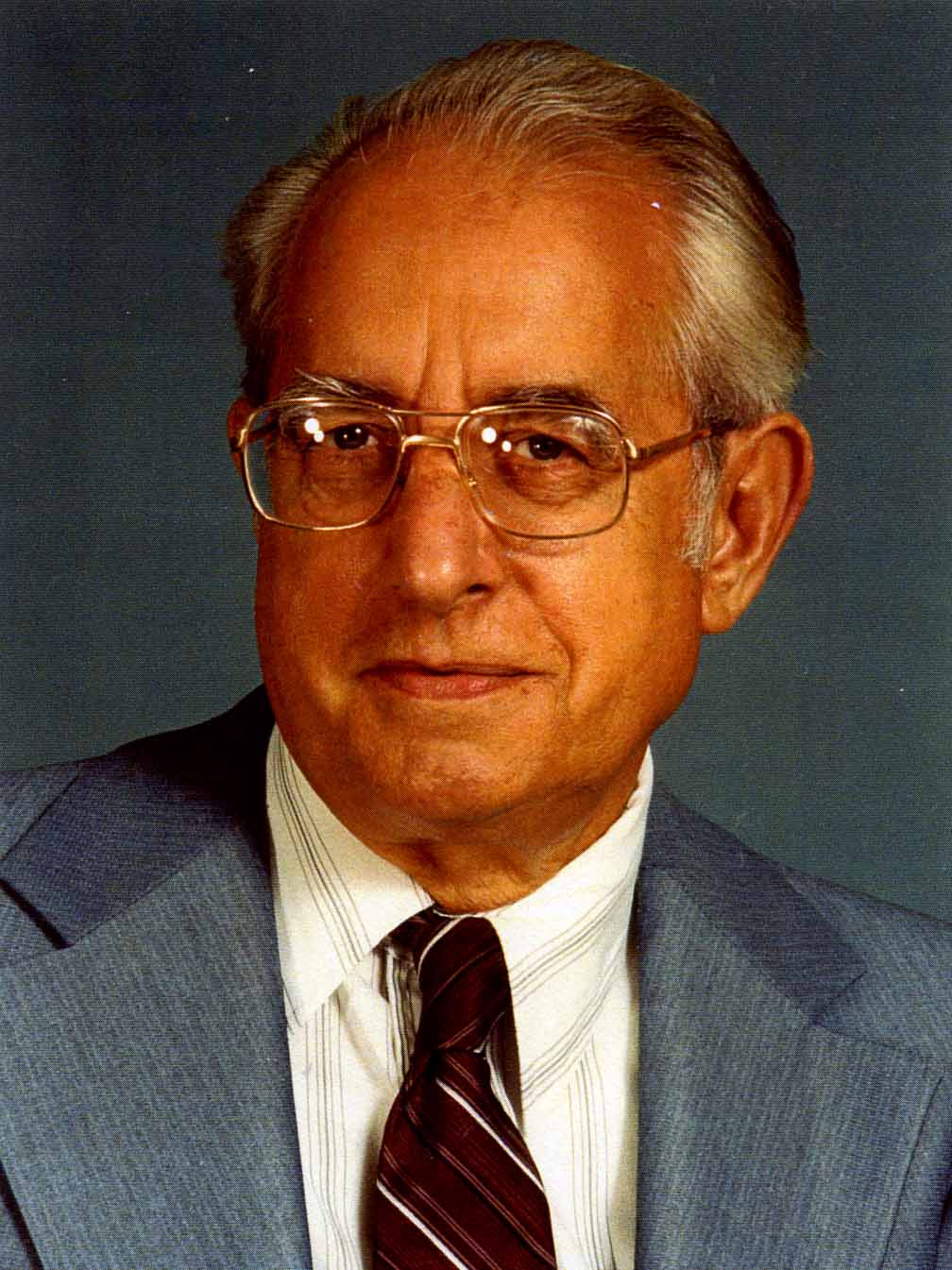
- Born: September 3, 1919; Hanna, Wyoming, U.S.
- Died: December 22, 2008 (aged 89); Santa Barbara, California, U.S.
- Title: Professor of Civil Engineering
- Spouse: Audrey Bowers
- Children: 2, including John E. Bowers
- Awards: Collingwood Prize, American Society of Engineering (1950) American Men of Science Teacher of the Year, Institute of Technology, University of Minnesota (1984) National Weather Service-Special Service Award (1984) Award for Outstanding Contributions, Civil Engineering Students (1984)

Academic background
- Education: B.S., Civil Engineering (1942) M.S., Civil Engineering (1949)
- Alma mater: University of Wyoming; University of Minnesota

Charles E. Bowers (September 3, 1919 – December 22, 2008) was an American civil engineer, researcher, and educator. He was awarded the Collingwood Prize in 1950 for his study of the Panama Canal.

== Education ==
Bowers received a B.S. in Civil Engineering from the University of Wyoming in 1942. He then received an M.S. in Civil Engineering in 1949 from the University of Minnesota.

== Career ==
In 1942, Bowers joined the David Taylor Model Basin in Washington, D.C. He conducted hundreds of tests of ships and structures using the Circulating Water Channel and the Towing Basin. A particularly important project came up during World War II. Aircraft torpedoes were not exploding on impact with enemy ships, and the Allies were losing many ships to German and Japanese warships and submarines. This was particularly true at the Battle of Midway in June 1942. Bowers had to assemble a team and within a week had to design a system to impact torpedoes at 24 knots into targets at various angles and begin tests. They completed the tests and determined that the switches in the circuit were opening on impact before the signal to fire the explosive was sent. A redesigned circuit was successful and deployed throughout the Navy, and had a big impact on the war effort.

After the war, Bowers led a study to design a modern, wider Panama channel that would either be sea level or high lift lock design. The study was successfully completed and Bowers won the Collingwood award for this research; however, due to political reasons, modernization did not happen for the next 50 years. Bowers joined the U.S. Bureau of Reclamation after graduating from the University of Minnesota in 1949, where he worked on engineering projects before continuing his career in coastal and geotechnical engineering.

Subsequently, he joined the Saint Anthony Falls Laboratory of the University of Minnesota where he worked for the next thirty years.

In 2000, the University of Minnesota created an award in Bowers' honor, to annually recognize an outstanding computer science and engineering (CSE) professor who has demonstrated exceptional interest and commitment to teaching.

== Research ==
Bowers’s research focused on coastal and geotechnical engineering, particularly the design and stability of breakwaters exposed to wave action. The case of the Taconite Harbor breakwater compared to the Silver Bay breakwater on Lake Superior serves as a classic textbook lesson in coastal and geotechnical engineering design, illustrating the work of Bowers in breakwater design and stability. The contrast highlights the importance of calculating wave mechanics and using armor stone weights. Bowers concluded that the breakwater required an armor layer composed of 20-ton stones. This design specification enabled the structure to withstand the hydraulic pressures generated by Lake Superior's storms and severe wave action. Bowers concluded that the nearby Silver Bay breakwater's 6-ton armor stones were inadequate for the region's 20-foot design waves. The breakwater was destroyed during a storm in 1958, while the Taconite Harbor breakwater survived.

His most significant research involved a study of the cause of the failure of Kaptai Dam on the Karnafuli river in Bangladesh. The river originates in the Himalaya Mountains and the dam was supposed to protect against floods during the monsoon season. The dam is 136 feet high with a 745 foot wide spillway designed for a maximum flow of 640,000 cubic feet per second (cfs). Hydraulic jumps and a stilling basin were used to dissipate the energy of the water flowing down the spillway before entering the channel and impacting the channel below the dam. The spillway failed during the first monsoon season it experienced (in 1962) at a level (123,000 cfs), far below the design flow. Bowers was in charge of analyzing the cause of the failure, and they had to determine a solution before the next monsoon season. Their steady flow analysis and tests indicated the design was correct and the spillway should have survived at the flow where it failed. Prior to this time, information was not available on the magnitude of pressure fluctuations in hydraulic jumps (used to dissipate the energy in the water flowing down the spillway) and instrumentation was not available to measure the fluctuations.

Bowers had just started doing measurements on pressure fluctuations in stilling basins for their other design work, and they checked the pressure fluctuations in the stilling basin. Since the stilling basin must dissipate many millions of horsepower before the flow enters the river channel, very violent eddies are generated. These result in correspondingly high pressure fluctuations. Their test data indicate that these fluctuations could easily have caused uplift of the chute slab and subsequent failure of the spillway. This resulted in modifications to how spillways are designed, and much thicker concrete is used to withstand the dynamic fluctuations in spillways. In implementing this knowledge, dams throughout the world are now safer as a result.

== Awards and honors ==
- Collingwood Award, American Society of Engineering (1950)
- American Men of Science
- Teacher of the Year, Institute of Technology, University of Minnesota (1984)
- National Weather Service-Special Service Award (1984)
- Award for Outstanding Contributions, Civil Engineering students (1984)

== Selected Papers ==
- Bowers, Charles E.; Tsai, Frank Y.; Kuha, Roy M.. (1964). Hydraulic Studies of The Spillway of The Karnafuli Hydroelectric Project East Pakistan. St. Anthony Falls Laboratory. Retrieved from the University of Minnesota Digital Conservancy, http://hdl.handle.net/11299/114074.
- Song, Charles; Pabst, Arthur; Bowers, C. Edward. (1973). Simulation of the Quantity and Quality of Flow in a River Basin. St. Anthony Falls Hydraulic Laboratory. Retrieved from the University of Minnesota Digital Conservancy, http://hdl.handle.net/11299/114855.
- Bowers, C. Edward; Pabst, Arthur. (1968). Review and Analysis of Rainfall and Runoff Data for Selected Watersheds in Minnesota. St. Anthony Falls Hydraulic Laboratory. Retrieved from the University of Minnesota Digital Conservancy, http://hdl.handle.net/11299/114236.
- Straub, Lorenz G.; Anderson, Alvin G.; Bowers, Charles E.. (1954). Effect of Inlet Design on Capacity of Culverts on Steep Slopes. St. Anthony Falls Hydraulic Laboratory. Retrieved from the University of Minnesota Digital Conservancy, http://hdl.handle.net/11299/108246.
- Straub, Lorenz G.; Anderson, Alvin G.; Bowers, Charles E.. (1954). Effect of Inlet Design on Capacity of Culverts on Steep Slopes. St. Anthony Falls Hydraulic Laboratory. Retrieved from the University of Minnesota Digital Conservancy, http://hdl.handle.net/11299/108246.
- Lorenz G Straub, Harald D Frederiksen, Joseph M Wetzel, Charles E Bowers, “Wave Attenuating device and method of attenuating waves”, US Patent US3237414A
- Song, Charles; Pabst, Arthur; Bowers, C. Edward. (1973). Simulation of the Quantity and Quality of Flow in a River Basin. St. Anthony Falls Hydraulic Laboratory. Retrieved from the University of Minnesota Digital Conservancy, http://hdl.handle.net/11299/114855.
- Bowers, C. Edward; Pabst, Arthur; Larson, Steven P.. (1972). Computer Programs in Hydrology. St. Anthony Falls Hydraulic Laboratory. Retrieved from the University of Minnesota Digital Conservancy, http://hdl.handle.net/11299/108497.
