= Miklos Porkolab =

Hungarian-American physicist

- Born: March 24, 1939 (age 87); Budapest, Hungary
- Education: University of British Columbia (B.S.); Stanford University (M.S., Ph.D.)
- Known for: plasma waves, plasma microturbulence, phase-contrast imaging
- Awards: Humboldt Prize (1976); John Dawson Award (1984); Karoly Simony Memorial Plaque and Prize (2007); Fusion Power Associates Distinguished Career Award (2010); James Clerk Maxwell Prize for Plasma Physics (2009); Hannes Alfvén Prize (2013)
- Scientific career
- Fields: Plasma Physics
- Workplaces: Massachusetts Institute of Technology
- Thesis: Microinstabilities and Diffusion Processes in a Thermal Plasma (1967)
- Doctoral advisor: Gordon S. Kino

Miklos Porkolab (born March 24, 1939) is a Hungarian-American physicist specializing in plasma physics.

== Early life and career ==
In 1957, Porkolab emigrated from Hungary to Canada. He obtained his bachelor's degree at the University of British Columbia in 1963 and then his master's degree and Ph.D. from Stanford University in 1964 and 1967 respectively.

He moved to the Princeton Plasma Physics Laboratory, where he worked as a senior research physicist until 1975. During the following year, Porkolab worked at the Max Planck Institute for Plasma Physics in Garching, Germany, under the auspices of the Humboldt Foundation as a winner of the "US Senior Scientist Award". In 1977, he became professor of physics at the Massachusetts Institute of Technology, where he later led the Plasma Science and Fusion Center (PSFC) for many years.

Between 1991 and 2001, Porkolab served as editor of Physics Letters A, in the Plasma Physics and Fluid Dynamics subsection. He also represented the U.S. Plasma Physics community for six years on the International Union of Pure and Applied Physics (IUPAP) Commission–16 (Plasma Physics) (1991-1997). Between 1992 and 1995, he served as a member of the National Research Council Subpanel on Plasma Science. In 1999, he served as chair of the Plasma Physics Division of the American Physical Society.

== Scientific contributions ==
Whilst at Princeton, Porkolab concentrated on dispersive properties of plasma waves and instabilities in magnetized plasmas. Measurements corroborating the validity of the collisionless Boltzmann equation and demonstrating nonlinear scattering of Bernstein waves with wavelengths comparable to the electron Larmor radius were obtained. Porkolab's work provided experimental verifications of Landau damping, nonlinear resonant wave-wave scattering and parametric instabilities, also predicting upper hybrid solitons.

From 1977, whilst at the MIT Physics Department, Porkolab joined the newly established MIT Plasma Science and Fusion Center, where he began experiments on lower hybrid current drive in tokamak plasmas. He also carried out investigations on ion cyclotron heating and mode conversion processes in multi-ion species fusion plasmas. Phase-contrast imaging (PCI) was developed by Porkolab's group both for use at the Alcator C-Mod tokamak and the DIII-D tokamak of General Atomics in San Diego. In recent years, PCI measurements contributed to the advanced in understanding of turbulence and Alfvén wave phenomena.

== Honors and awards ==
For his work on radio frequency heating and noninductive current drive on the Versator II, the Alcator C and C-Mod tokamaks, Professor Porkolab shared the 1984 American Physical Society Excellence in Plasma Research Award (now the John Dawson Award).

In 2009, Porkolab was awarded the James Clerk Maxwell Prize for Plasma Physics by the American Physical Society for

"pioneering investigations of linear and nonlinear plasma waves and wave-particle interactions; fundamental contributions to the development of plasma heating, current drive and diagnostics; and leadership in promoting plasma science education and domestic and international collaborations."

In 2013, he received the Hannes Alfvén Prize of the European Physical Society for

"for pioneering investigations of linear and nonlinear plasma waves and wave-particle interactions; fundamental contributions to the development of plasma heating, current drive and diagnostics; and leadership in promoting plasma science education and domestic and international collaborations."

Porkolab was also awarded the Karoly Simony Memorial Plaque and Prize by the Hungarian Nuclear Society in 2007 and a Fusion Power Associates Distinguished Career Award in 2010.

In 2016, Porkolab was elected an External Member of the Hungarian Academy of Sciences.
