= Mario Crocco =

Argentine neurobiologist

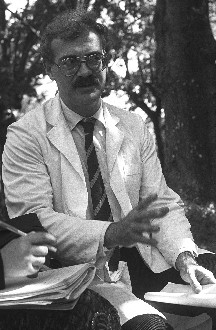
Mario Crocco

Mario Crocco is an Argentine neurobiologist, since 1982 director of the Neurobiological Investigations Center of the Argentine health ministry and since 1988 director of the Electroneurobiological Investigations Laboratory at Hospital Borda in Buenos Aires.

Crocco is internationally known for having proposed in March 2007, a new taxonomic system that would include the hypothetical microorganism thought to have been detected on Mars by the Viking lander biological experiments in 1976. Though these findings were later deemed inconclusive, some scientists interpret the results as evidence of metabolism, and therefore of life; the major proponents of this position are Gilbert Levin, Rafael Navarro-González, and Ronald Paepe.

== Gillevinia straata ==
Crocco proposed the creation of new Linnaean categories in order to incorporate hypothetical Martian microorganisms:

- Carbon-based life: Solaria
- Biosphere: Marciana - All living or extinct organisms whose lineages developed on Mars. A parallel taxon, including all earth-based lineages, is Terrestria.
- Kingdom: Jakobia - All members of Marciana whose anatomy and physiology are adapted to the ultraviolet radiation and other conditions characteristic of the Martian topsoil and other Martian biomes. (The name of the kingdom is an homage to the Bavarian-Argentine neurobiologist Christfried Jakob.)
- Genus and species: Gillevinia straata (in honor of Gilbert Levin and Patricia Straat, who conducted the original Viking experiments)

The intended effect was to reverse the burden of proof concerning the life issue, but biologists stated that naming a 'species' at this point is inappropriate, as it may lend credibility to the possibility that life has been detected. The proposed rationale was rejected by the scientific community and it remains a Nomen nudum as there is no evidence of organic biomolecules.

== Neurobiology and psychophysics ==
Contributions to those fields are summarized in a Festschrift from 2008 (2nd ed., 2014), available from Internet:

Contreras, Norberto C. (2014). Algunos aportes de Mario Crocco a la neurobiología y psicofísica (in Spanish). Buenos Aires: Ediciones Rueda. ISBN 978-950-564-097-3.

== See also ==
- Life on Mars
- Viking lander biological experiments
