= Photonics Research =

Peer-reviewed scientific journal

- Discipline: Photonics, optics
- Language: English
- Edited by: Siyuan Yu

Publication details
- History: 2013—present
- Publisher: Optica, Chinese Laser Press
- Frequency: Monthly
- Open access: Yes
- Impact factor: 7.1 (2025)

Standard abbreviations
- ISO 4: Photonics Res.

Indexing
- CODEN: PRHEIZ
- ISSN: 2327-9125

Links
- Journal homepage; Online access; Online archive

Photonics Research is a peer-reviewed and open access scientific journal co-published quarterly by Optica and Chinese Laser Press. Established in 2013, it covers developments in photonics and optics, including but not limited to laser science, fiber optics, biophotonics and optical materials. Its current editor-in-chief is Siyuan Yu (Sun Yat-sen University).

== Abstracting and indexing ==
The journal is abstracted and indexed in:

- Current Contents/Engineering, Computing & Technology
- Current Contents/Physical, Chemical & Earth Sciences
- Ei Compendex
- Inspec
- Science Citation Index Expanded
- Scopus

According to the Journal Citation Reports, the journal has a 2025 impact factor of 7.1.
