= Hybrid silicon laser =

A hybrid silicon laser is a semiconductor laser fabricated from both silicon and group III-V semiconductor materials. The hybrid silicon laser was developed to address the lack of a silicon laser to enable fabrication of low-cost, mass-producible silicon optical devices. The hybrid approach takes advantage of the light-emitting properties of III-V semiconductor materials combined with the process maturity of silicon to fabricate electrically driven lasers on a silicon wafer that can be integrated with other silicon photonic devices.

== Physics ==
A hybrid silicon laser is an optical source that is fabricated from both silicon and group III-V semiconductor materials (e.g. Indium(III) phosphide, Gallium(III) arsenide). It comprises a silicon waveguide fused to an active, light-emitting, III-V epitaxial semiconductor wafer. The III-V epitaxial wafer is designed with different layers such that the active layer can emit light when it is excited either by shining light, e.g. a laser onto it; or by passing electricity through it. The emitted light from the active layer couples into the silicon waveguide due to their close proximity (<130 nm separation) where it can be guided to reflect off mirrors at the end of the silicon waveguide to form the laser cavity.

== Fabricate ==
The silicon laser is fabricated by a technique called plasma assisted wafer bonding. Silicon waveguides are first fabricated on a silicon on insulator (SOI) wafer. This SOI wafer and the un-patterned III-V wafer are then exposed to an oxygen plasma before being pressed together at a low (for semiconductor manufacturing) temperature of 300C for 12 hours. This process fuses the two wafers together. The III-V wafer is then etched into mesas to expose electrical layers in the epitaxial structure. Metal contacts are fabricated on these contact layers allowing electric current to flow to the active region.

Silicon manufacturing and fabrication is widely used in the electronic industry to mass-produce low-cost electronic devices. Silicon photonics uses these same electronic manufacturing technologies to make low-cost integrated optical devices. One issue with using silicon for an optical device is that silicon is a poor light emitter and cannot be used to make an electrically pumped laser. This means that lasers have first to be fabricated on a separate III-V semiconductor wafer before being individually aligned to each silicon device, in a process that is both costly and time-consuming, limiting the total number of lasers that can be used on a silicon photonic circuit. By using this wafer bonding technique many hybrid silicon lasers can be fabricated simultaneously on a silicon wafer, all aligned to the silicon photonic devices.

== Uses ==
Potential uses cited in the references below include fabricating many, possibly hundreds of hybrid silicon lasers on a die and using silicon photonics to combine them together to form high bandwidth optical links for personal computers, servers or back planes. These lasers are now fabricated on 300 mm silicon wafers in CMOS foundries in volumes of over one million per year.

The low loss of silicon waveguides means these lasers can have very narrow linewidths (<1 kHz) which opens up new applications such as coherent transmitters, optical LIDARs, optical gyroscopes, and other applications. These lasers can be used to pump nonlinear devices to make optical synthesizers with a stability of 1 part in 10^{17}.

== History ==
- Pulsed optically pumped lasing first demonstrated by John E. Bowers' group at UCSB
- Continuous wave optically pumped lasing demonstrated by Intel and UCSB
- Continuous wave electrically driven lasing demonstrated by UCSB and Intel
- Single wavelength distributed feedback lasers on silicon
- Short pulse mode locked lasers on silicon
- Quantum cascade lasers on silicon
- Interband cascade lasers on silicon
