= Viking 1 =

NASA robotic spacecraft sent to Mars

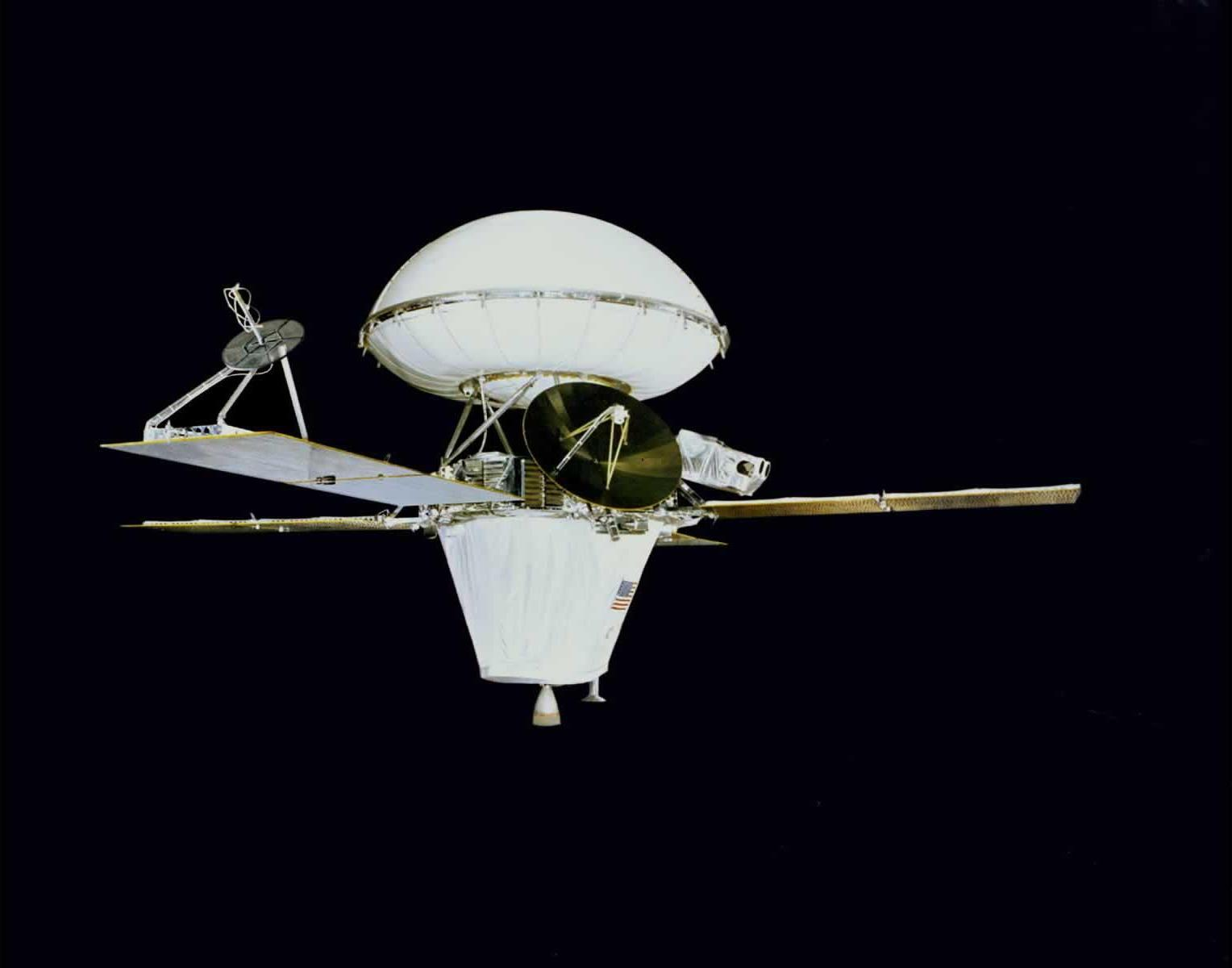
- Lander shell (top) and orbiter
- Mission type: Mars Orbiter/Lander
- Operator: NASA
- COSPAR ID: Orbiter: 1975-075A; Lander: 1975-075C
- SATCAT no.: Orbiter: 8108; Lander: 9024
- Website: Viking Project Information
- Mission duration: Orbiter: 1,846 days (1797 sols); Lander: 2,306 days (2,245 sols); Launch to last contact: 2,642 days

Spacecraft properties
- Manufacturer: Orbiter: JPL; Lander: Martin Marietta
- Launch mass: 3,530 kg (Note: "fully fueled orbiter-lander pair")
- Dry mass: Orbiter: 883 kg (1,947 lb); Lander: 572 kg (1,261 lb)
- Power: Orbiter: 620 W Lander: 70 W

Start of mission
- Launch date: 21:22, August 20, 1975 (UTC)
- Rocket: Titan IIIE/Centaur
- Launch site: LC-41, Cape Canaveral
- Contractor: Martin Marietta

End of mission
- Last contact: November 11, 1982

Orbital parameters
- Reference system: Areocentric
- Eccentricity: 0.88221
- Periareion altitude: 320 km (200 mi)
- Apoareion altitude: 56,000 km (35,000 mi)
- Inclination: 39.3°
- Period: 47.26 hours
- Epoch: August 7, 1980

Mars orbiter
- Spacecraft component: Viking 1 Orbiter
- Orbital insertion: June 19, 1976

Mars lander
- Spacecraft component: Viking 1 Lander
- Landing date: July 20, 1976; 11:53:06 UTC (MSD 36455 18:40 AMT)
- Landing site: 22.27°N 312.05°E
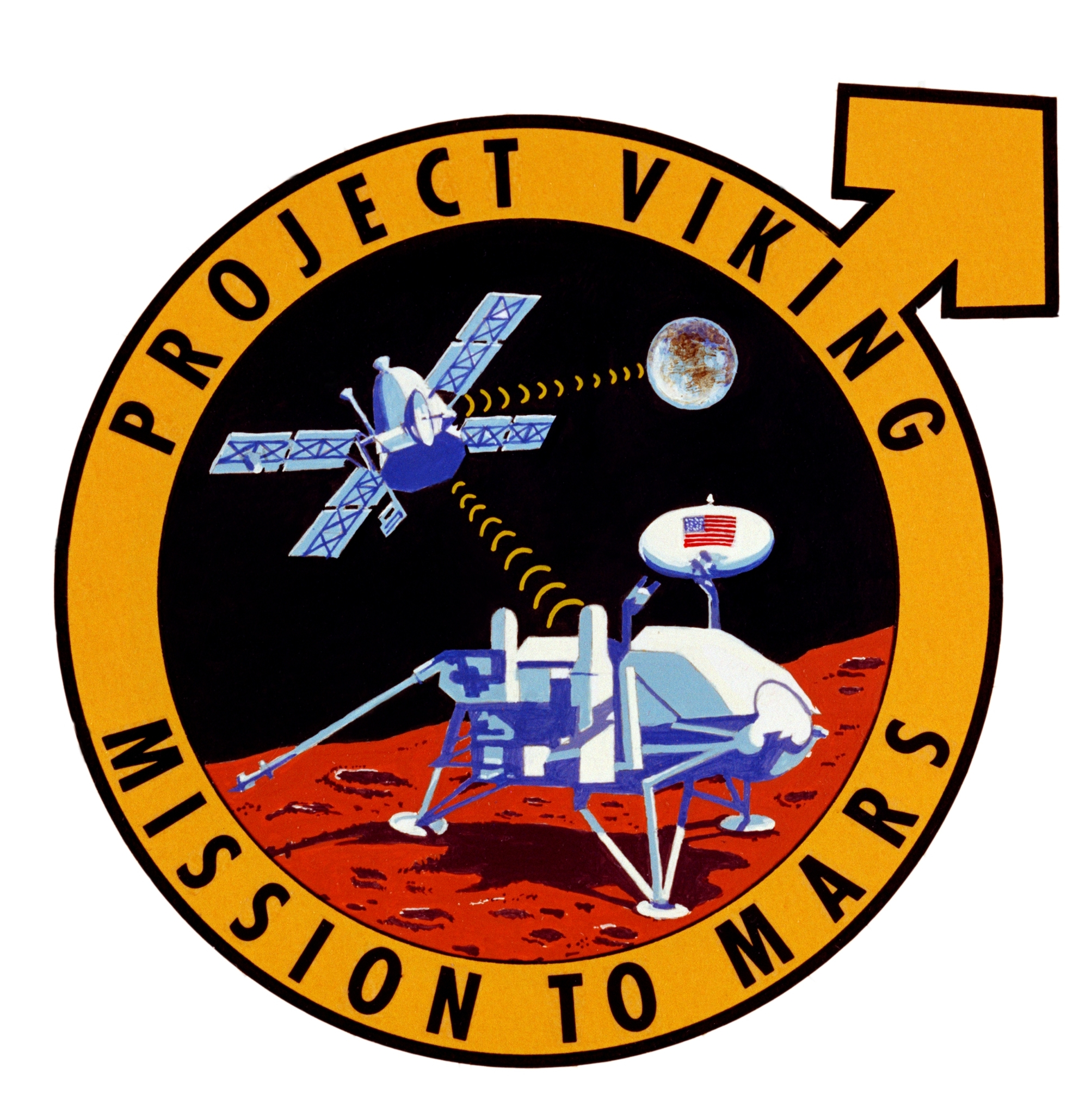
- Large Strategic Science Missions; Planetary Science Division Viking program

Viking 1 is the first of two spacecraft, along with Viking 2, each consisting of an orbiter and a lander, sent to Mars as part of NASA's Viking program. The lander touched down on Mars on July 20, 1976, the first successful Mars lander in history. Viking 1 operated on Mars for 2,307 days (over 6 1/4 years) or 2245 Martian solar days, the longest extraterrestrial surface mission until the record was broken by the Opportunity rover on May 19, 2010.

== Mission ==
Following launch using a Titan/Centaur launch vehicle on August 20, 1975, and an 11-month cruise to Mars, the orbiter began returning global images of Mars about five days before orbit insertion. The Viking 1 Orbiter was inserted into Mars orbit on June 19, 1976, and trimmed to a 1,513 x 33,000 km, 24.66 h site certification orbit on June 21. Landing on Mars was planned for July 4, 1976, the United States Bicentennial, but imaging of the primary landing site showed it was too rough for a safe landing. The landing was delayed until a safer site was found, and took place instead on July 20, the seventh anniversary of the Apollo 11 Moon landing. The lander separated from the orbiter at 08:51 UTC and landed at Chryse Planitia at 11:53:06 UTC. It was the first attempt by the United States at landing on Mars.

=== Orbiter ===
The instruments of the orbiter consisted of two vidicon cameras for imaging, an infrared spectrometer for water vapor mapping, and infrared radiometers for thermal mapping. The orbiter primary mission ended at the beginning of solar conjunction on November 5, 1976. The extended mission commenced on December 14, 1976, after solar conjunction. Operations included close approaches to Phobos in February 1977. The periapsis was reduced to 300 km on March 11, 1977. Minor orbit adjustments were done occasionally over the course of the mission, primarily to change the walk rate — the rate at which the areocentric longitude changed with each orbit — and the periapsis was raised to 357 km on July 20, 1979. On August 7, 1980, Viking 1 Orbiter was running low on attitude control gas and its orbit was raised from 357 × 33,943 km to 320 × 56,000 km to prevent impact with Mars and possible contamination until the year 2019. Operations were terminated on August 17, 1980, after 1,485 orbits. A 2009 analysis concluded that, while the possibility that Viking 1 had impacted Mars could not be ruled out, it was most likely still in orbit. More than 57,000 images were sent back to Earth.

=== Lander ===
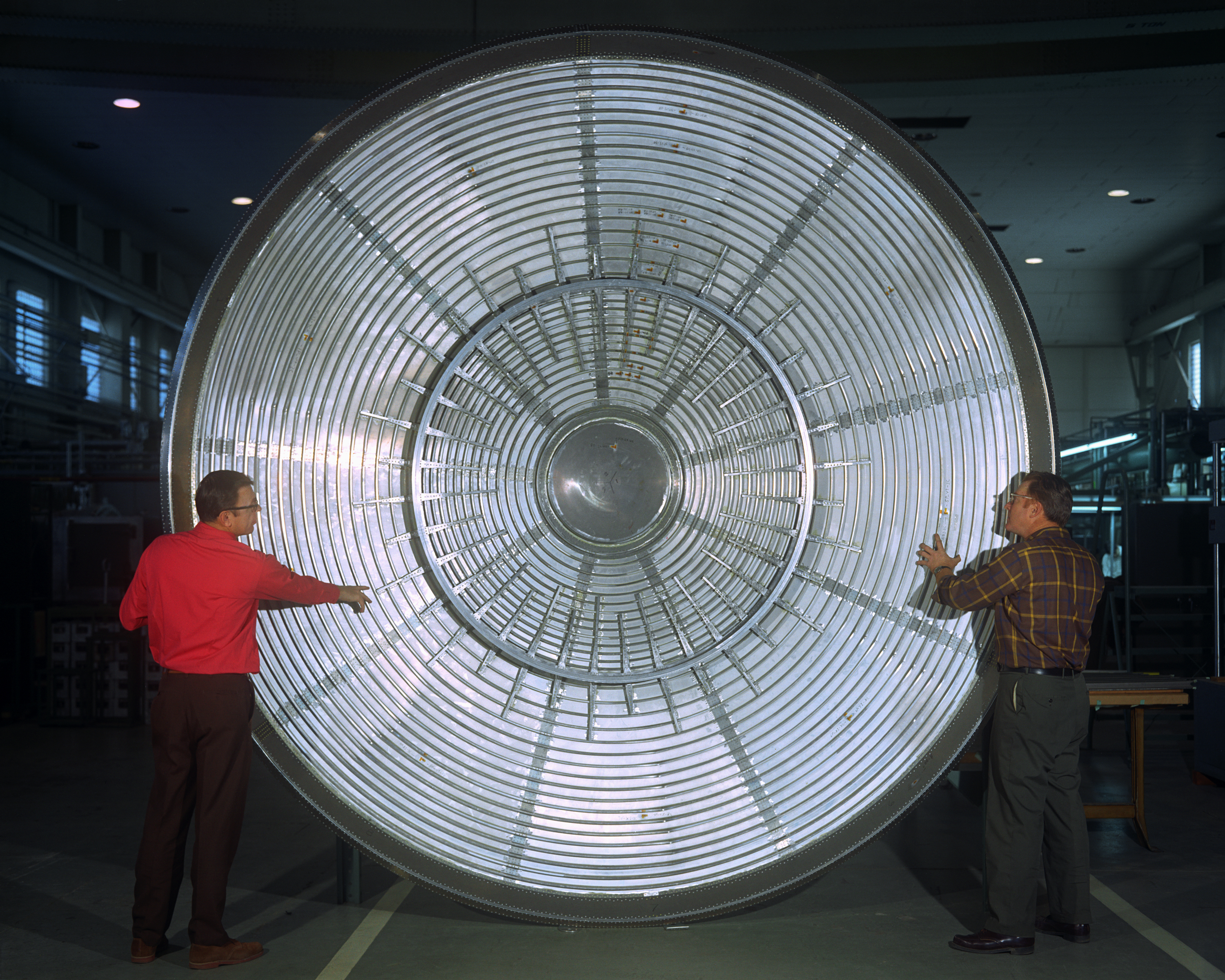
Viking aeroshell

The lander and its aeroshell separated from the orbiter on July 20 at 08:51 UTC. At the time of separation, the lander was orbiting at about 5 kilometers per second (3.1 miles per second). The aeroshell's retrorockets fired to begin the lander de-orbit maneuver. After a few hours at about 300 kilometers (190 miles) altitude, the lander was reoriented for atmospheric entry. The aeroshell with its ablative heat shield slowed the craft as it plunged through the atmosphere. During this time, entry science experiments were performed by using a retarding potential analyzer, a mass spectrometer, as well as pressure, temperature, and density sensors. At 6 km (3.7 mi) altitude, traveling at about 250 meters per second (820 feet per second), the 16 m diameter lander parachutes deployed. Seven seconds later the aeroshell was jettisoned, and eight seconds after that the three lander legs were extended. In 45 seconds, the parachute had slowed the lander to 60 meters per second (200 feet per second). At 1.5 km (0.93 mi) altitude, retrorockets on the lander itself were ignited and, 40 seconds later at about 2.4 m/s (7.9 ft/s), the lander arrived on Mars with a relatively light jolt. The legs had honeycomb aluminum shock absorbers to soften the landing.

Documentary clip recounting the Viking 1 landing with animation and video footage of the control center

The landing rockets used an 18-nozzle design to spread the hydrogen and nitrogen exhaust over a large area. NASA calculated that this approach would mean that the surface would not be heated by more than 1 °C (1.8 °F), and that it would move no more than 1 millimeter (0.04 inches) of surface material. Since most of Viking's experiments focused on the surface material a more straightforward design would not have served.

The Viking 1 lander touched down in western Chryse Planitia ("Golden Plain") at 22.697°N 312.05°E at a reference altitude of −2.69 kilometers (−1.67 mi) relative to a reference ellipsoid with an equatorial radius of 3,397 kilometers (2,111 mi) and a flatness of 0.0105 (22.480° N, 47.967° W planetographic) at 11:53:06 UTC (16:13 local Mars time). Approximately 22 kilograms (49 lb) of propellants were left at landing.

Transmission of the first surface image began 25 seconds after landing and took about four minutes (see below). During these minutes the lander activated itself. It erected a high-gain antenna pointed toward Earth for direct communication and deployed a meteorology boom mounted with sensors. In the next seven minutes the second picture of the 300° panoramic scene (displayed below) was taken. On the day after the landing the first color picture of the surface of Mars (displayed below) was taken. The seismometer failed to uncage, and a sampler arm locking pin was stuck and took five days to shake out. Otherwise, all experiments functioned normally.

The lander had two means of returning data to Earth: a relay link up to the orbiter and back, and by using a direct link to Earth. The orbiter could transmit to Earth (S-band) at 2,000 to 16,000 bit/s (depending on distance between Mars and Earth), and the lander could transmit to the orbiter at 16,000 bit/s. The data capacity of the relay link was about 10 times higher than the direct link.

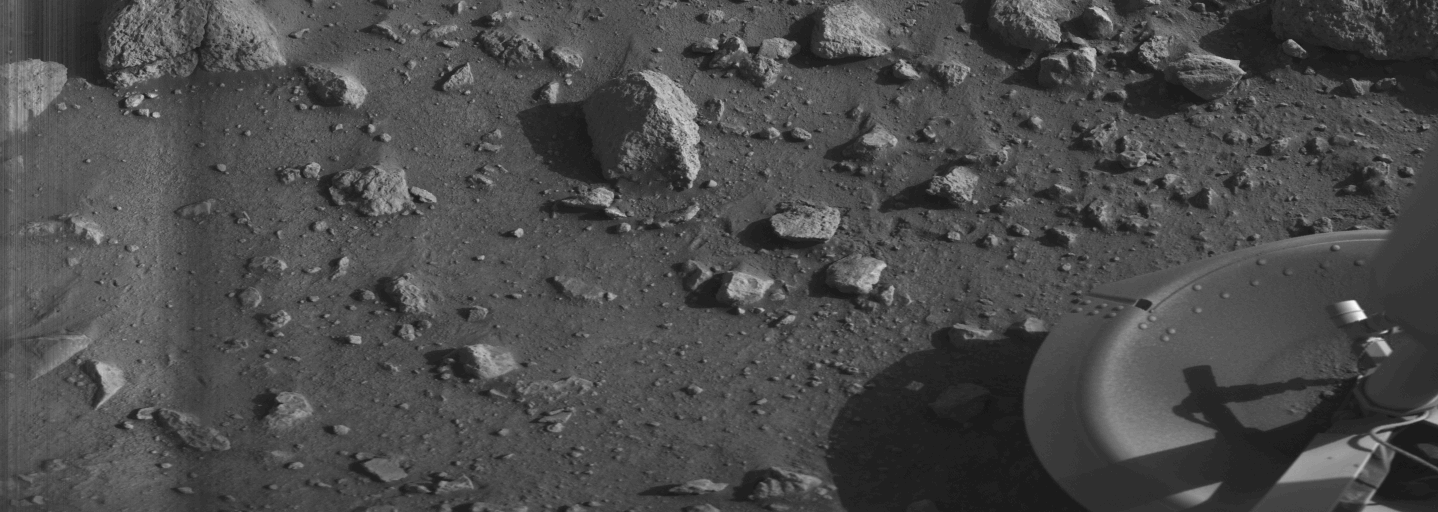
First "clear" image ever transmitted from the surface of Mars – shows rocks near the Viking 1 Lander (July 20, 1976). The haze on the left is possibly dust that had recently been kicked up by the landing rockets. Because of the "slow scan" facsimile nature of the cameras, the dust settled by mid-image.

The lander had two facsimile cameras; three analyses for metabolism, growth or photosynthesis; a gas chromatograph-mass spectrometer; an x-ray fluorescence spectrometer; pressure, temperature and wind velocity sensors; a three-axis seismometer; a magnet on a sampler observed by the cameras; and various engineering sensors.

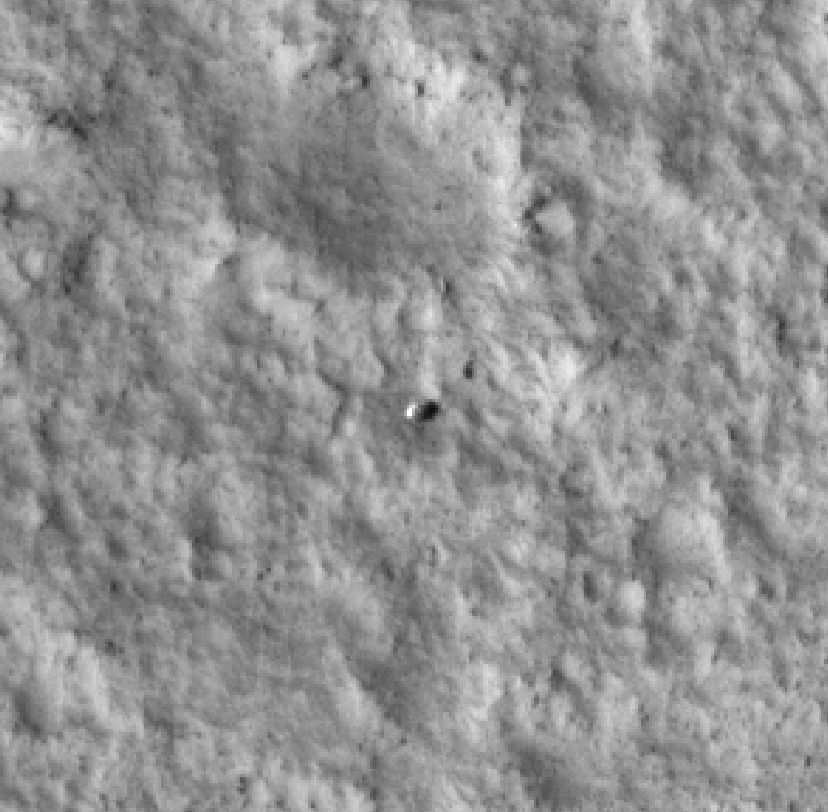
Photo of the Viking 1 Mars lander taken by the Mars Reconnaissance Orbiter in 2006

The Viking 1 lander was named the Thomas Mutch Memorial Station in January 1981 in honor of Thomas A. Mutch, the leader of the Viking imaging team. The lander operated for 2,245 sols (about 2,306 Earth days or 6 years) until November 11, 1982 (sol 2600), when a faulty command sent by ground control resulted in loss of contact. The command was intended to uplink new battery charging software to improve the lander's deteriorating battery capacity, but it inadvertently overwrote data used by the antenna pointing software. Attempts to contact the lander during the next four months, based on the presumed antenna position, were unsuccessful. In 2006, the Viking 1 lander was imaged on the Martian surface by the Mars Reconnaissance Orbiter.

== Mission Results ==
Viking 1 operated on the surface of Mars for approximately six Earth years and 114 days – until November 11, 1982, when the lander was inadvertently sent a faulty command. The robotic sampler arm successfully scooped up soil samples and tested them with instruments such as the Gas chromatography–mass spectrometer. Atmospheric temperature recordings were as high as -14 C (7 F) at midday, and the predawn summer temperature was -77 C (-107 F). The landers had issues obtaining results from their seismometer.

=== Search for life ===
Viking 1 carried a biology experiment whose purpose was to look for evidence of life. The Viking lander biological experiments weighed 15.5 kg (34 lbs) and consisted of three subsystems: the pyrolytic release experiment (PR), the labeled release experiment (LR), and the gas exchange experiment (GEX). In addition, independent of the biology experiments, Viking carried a gas chromatograph-mass spectrometer that could measure the composition and abundance of organic compounds in the Martian soil. The results were surprising and interesting: the spectrometer gave a negative result; the PR gave a negative result, the GEX gave a negative result, and the LR gave a positive result. Viking scientist Patricia Straat stated in 2009, "Our [LR] experiment was a definite positive response for life, but a lot of people have claimed that it was a false positive for a variety of reasons." Most scientists now believe that the data were due to inorganic chemical reactions of the soil; however, this view may be changing after the recent discovery of near-surface ice near the Viking landing zone. Some scientists still believe the results were due to living reactions. No organic chemicals were found in the soil. However, dry areas of Antarctica do not have detectable organic compounds either, but they have organisms living in the rocks. Mars has almost no ozone layer, unlike the Earth, so UV light sterilizes the surface and produces highly reactive chemicals such as peroxides that would oxidize any organic chemicals. The Phoenix Lander discovered the chemical perchlorate in the Martian soil. Perchlorate is a strong oxidant so it may have destroyed any organic matter on the surface. If it is widespread on Mars, carbon-based life would be difficult at the soil surface.

=== First panorama by Viking 1 lander ===
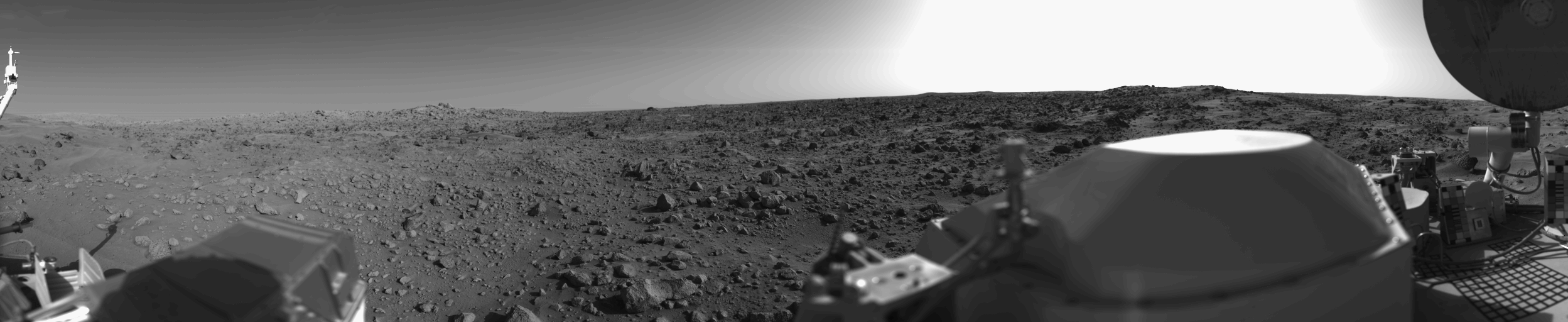
First panoramic view by Viking 1 from the surface of Mars. Captured on July 20, 1976.

=== Viking 1 image gallery ===
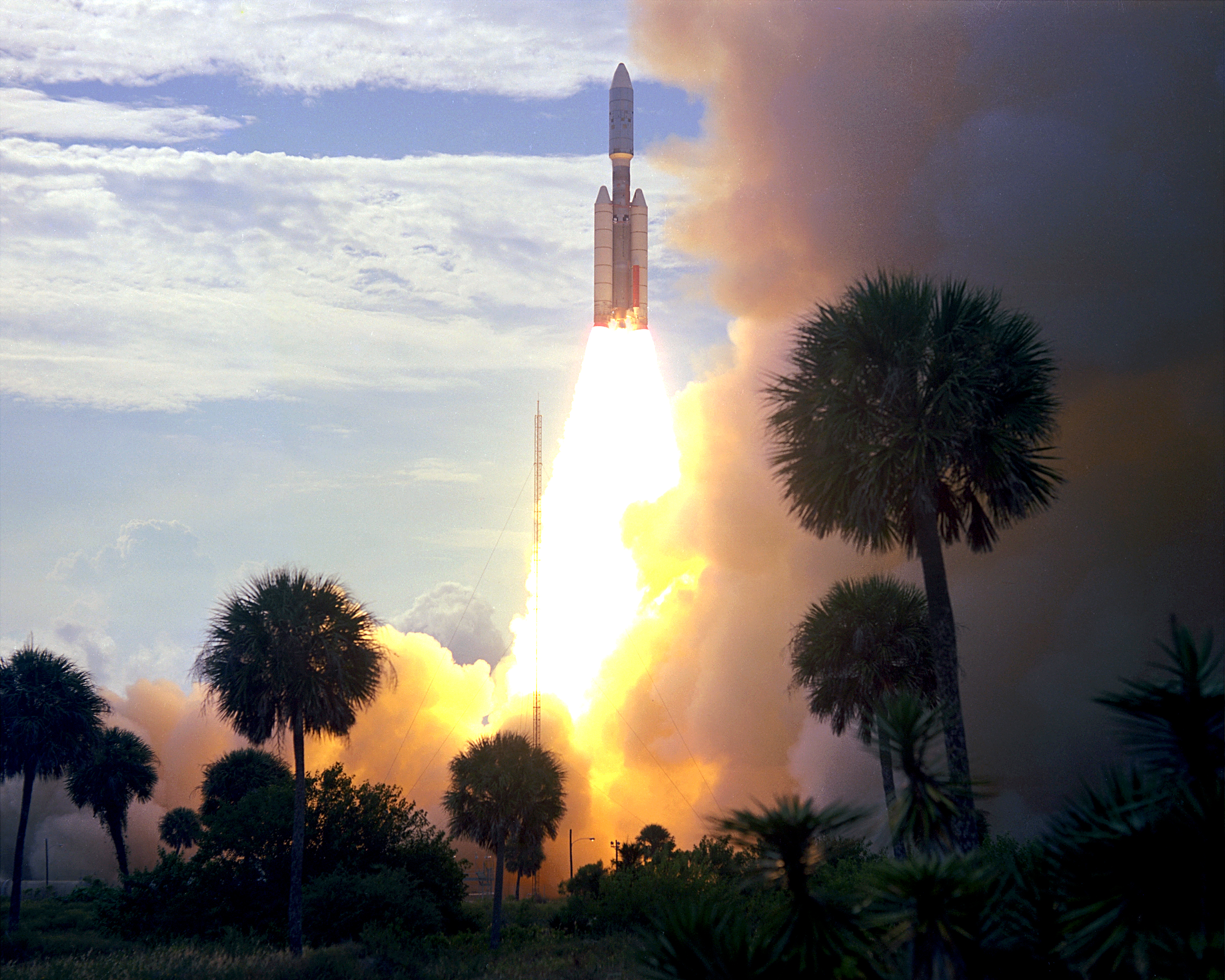
Launch of the Viking 1 probe (August 20, 1975)

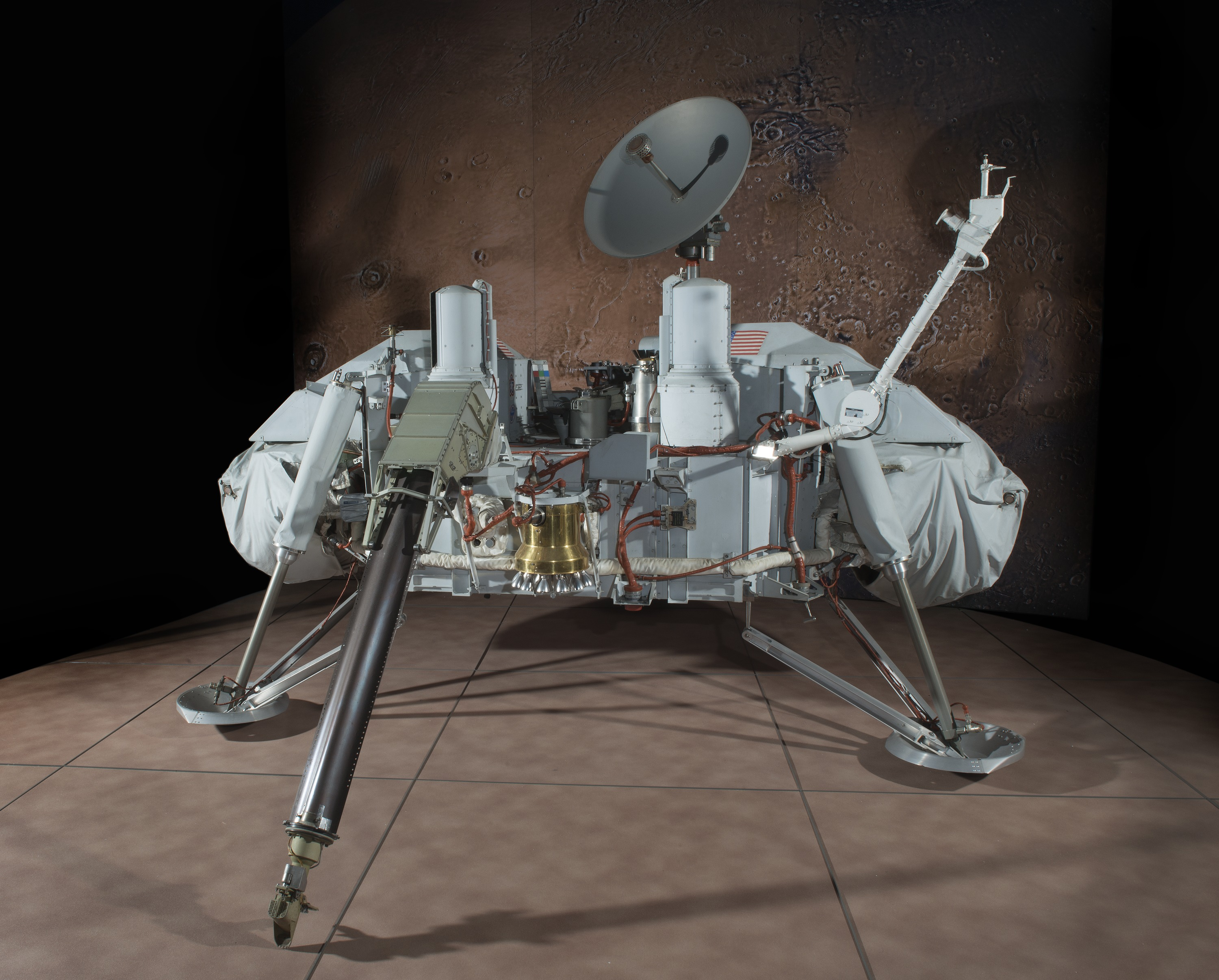
Proof test article of the Viking Mars Lander

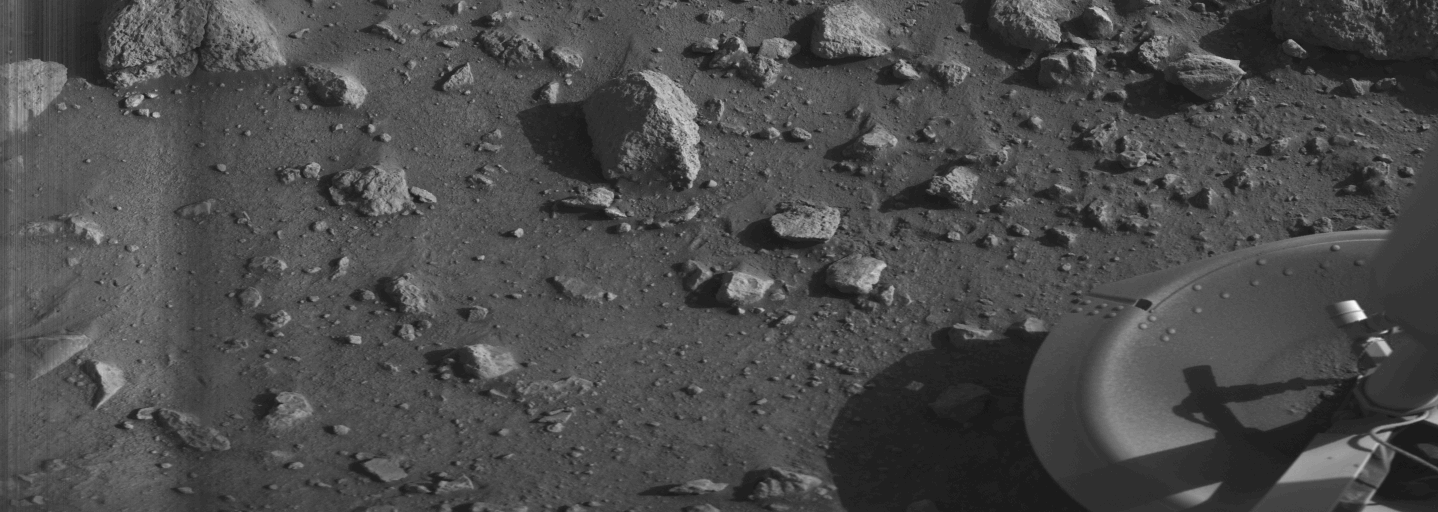
First image by the Viking 1 lander from the surface of Mars, showing lander's footpad

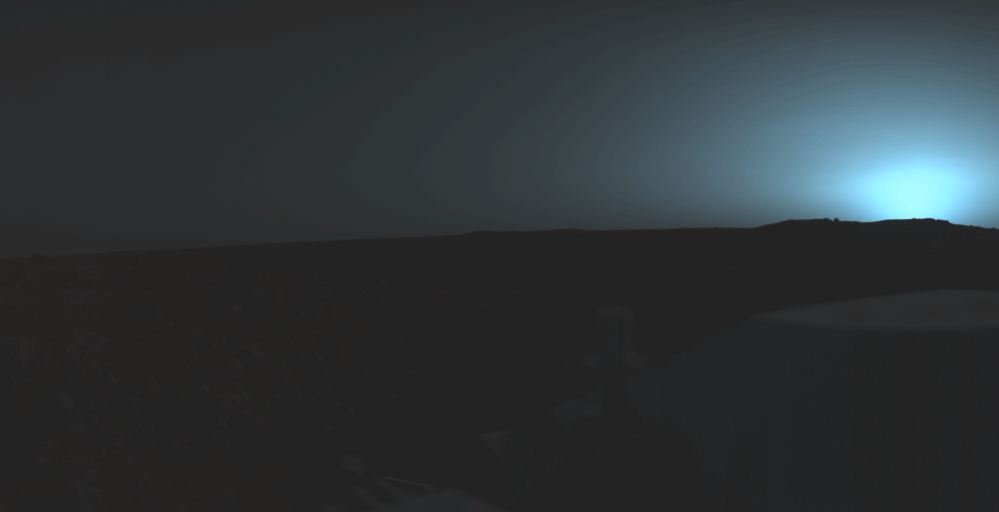
Viking 1 lander image of a Martian sunset over Chryse Planitia

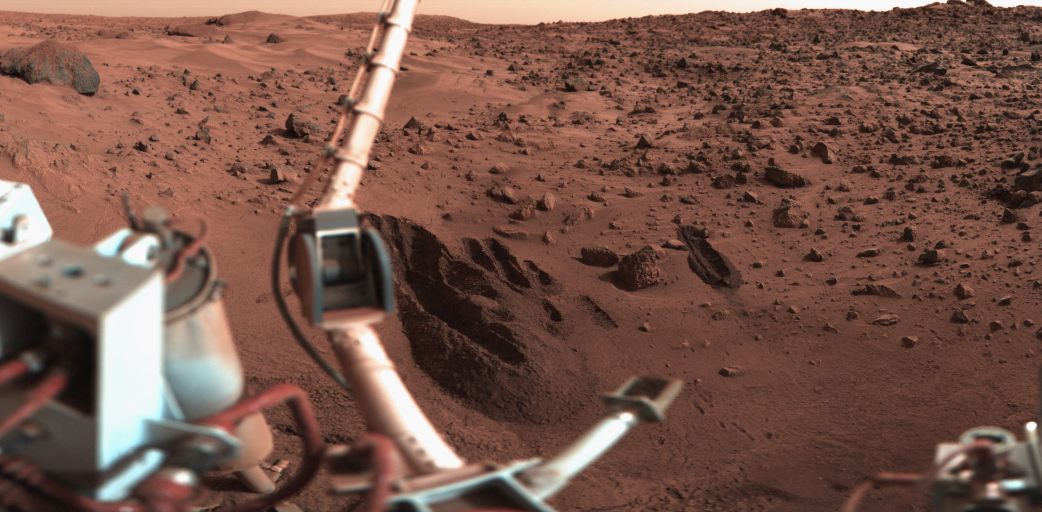
Trenches dug by soil sampler device

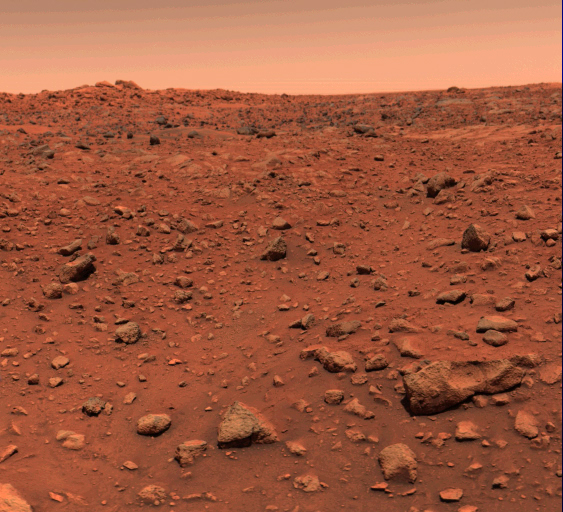
First color image taken by the Viking 1 lander (July 21, 1976)

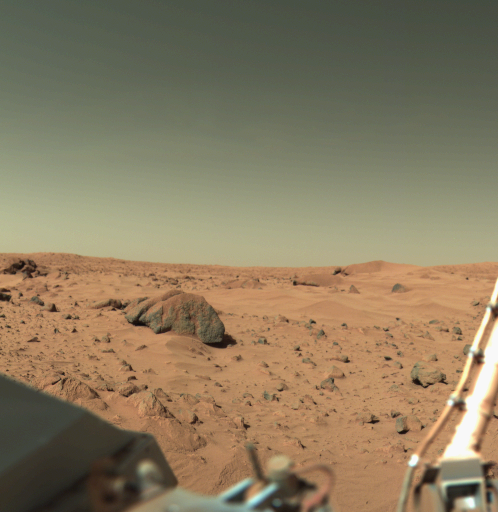
Viking 1 lander site (February 11, 1978)

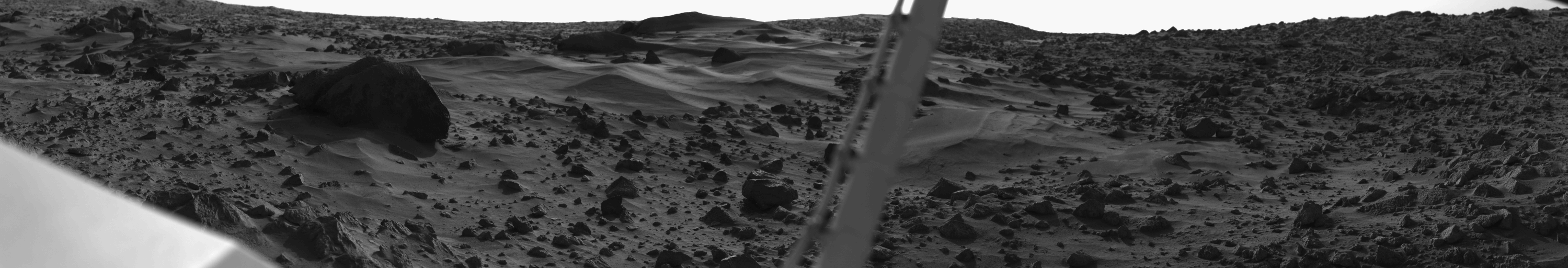
Dunes and large boulder. Pole in the center is an instrument boom.

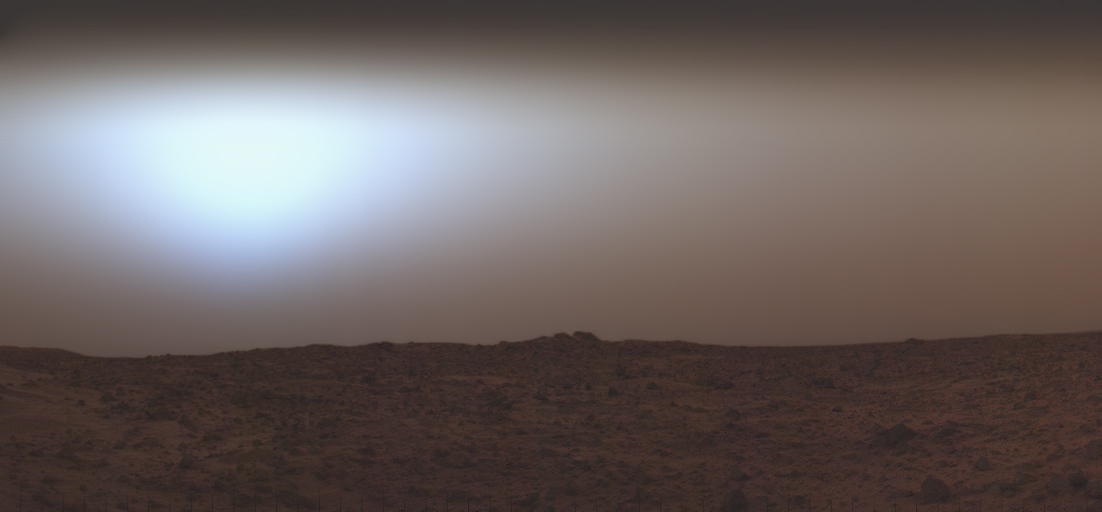
Viking 1 Lander Camera 2 Sky at sunrise (Low Resolution Color) Sol 379 07:50

== Test of general relativity ==
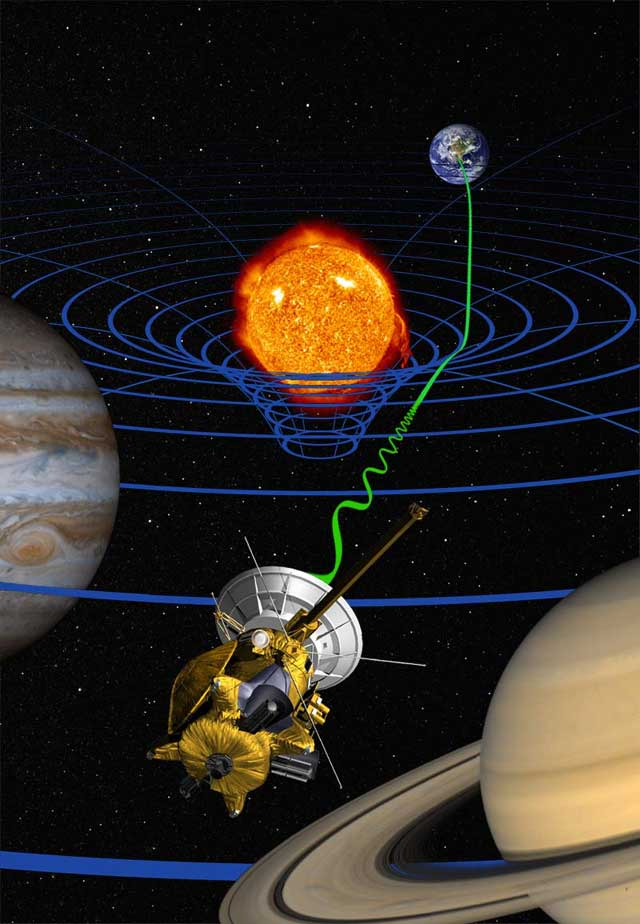
High-precision test of general relativity by the Cassini space probe (artist's impression)

Gravitational time dilation is a phenomenon predicted by the theory of general relativity whereby time passes more slowly in regions of lower gravitational potential. Scientists used the lander to test this hypothesis, by sending radio signals to the lander on Mars, and instructing the lander to send back signals, in cases which sometimes included the signal passing close to the Sun. Scientists found that the observed Shapiro delays of the signals matched the predictions of general relativity.

== Orbiter shots ==
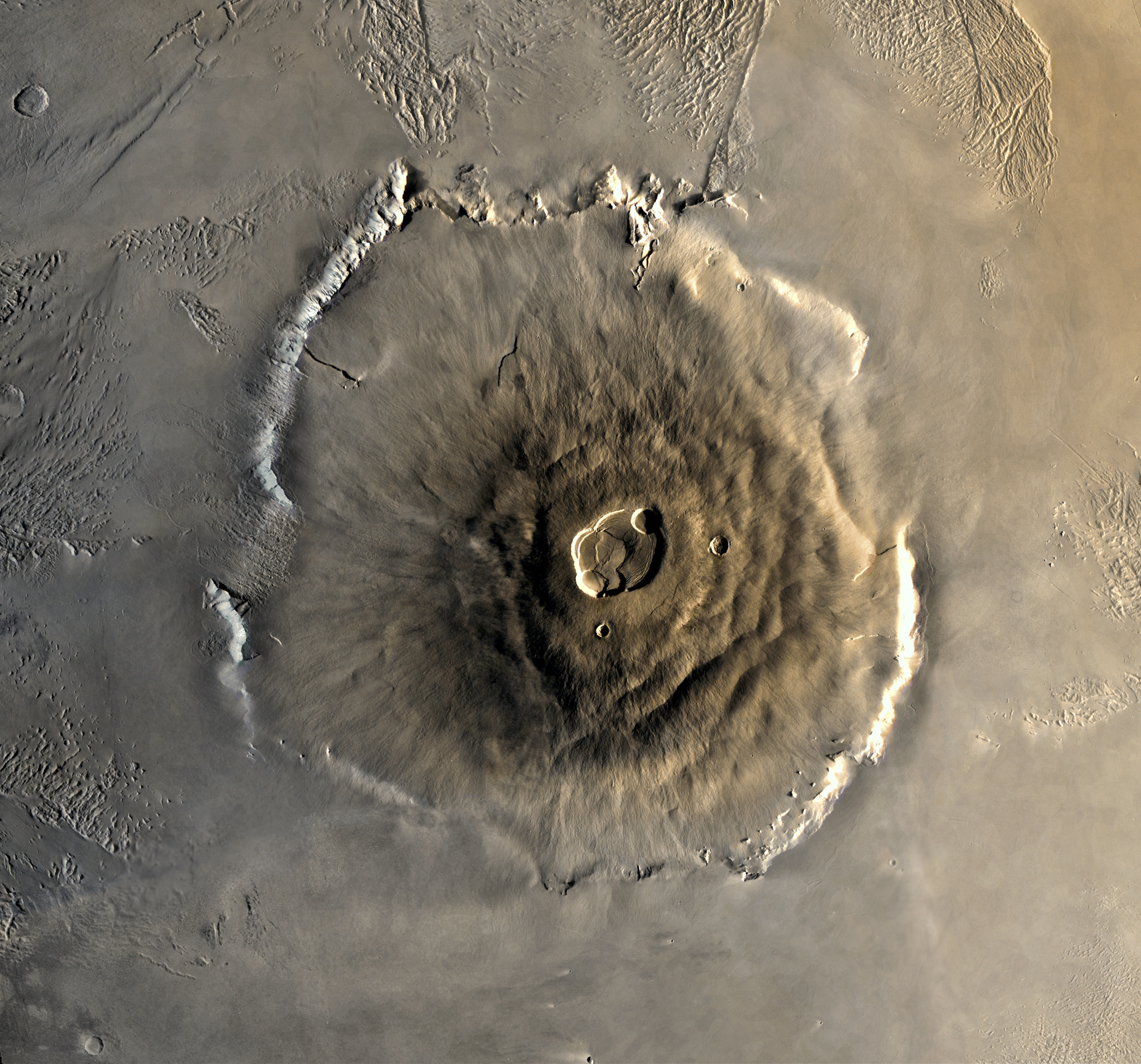
Olympus Mons

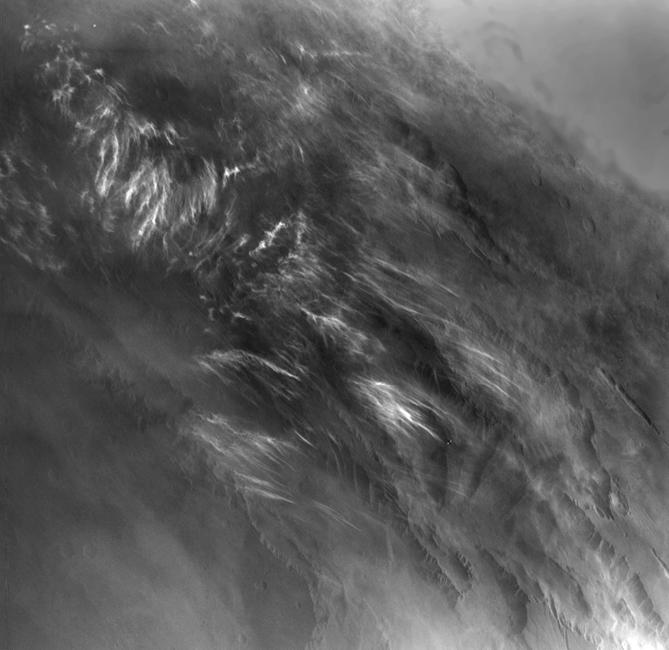
Morning Clouds on Mars (taken in 1976)

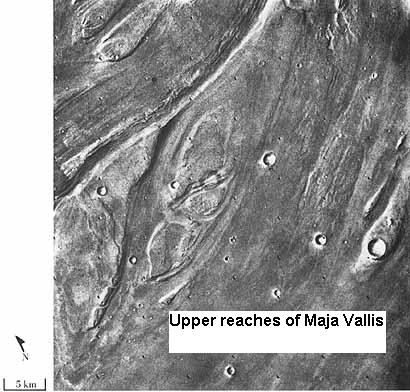
Streamlined islands in Lunae Palus quadrangle

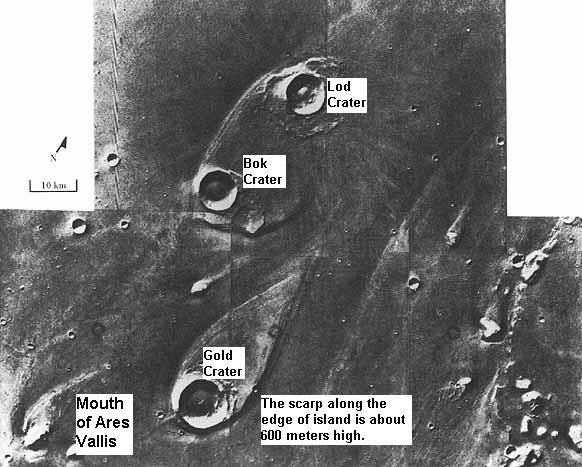
Tear-drop shaped islands at Oxia Palus quadrangle

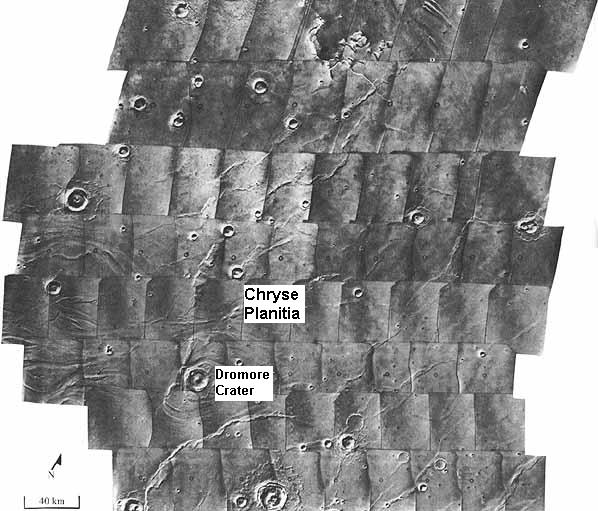
Scour patterns located in Lunae Palus quadrangle

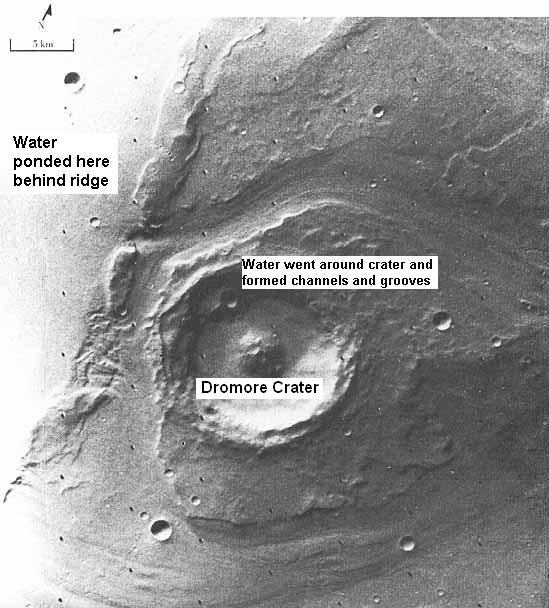
Lunae Palus quadrangle was eroded by large amounts of liquid water.

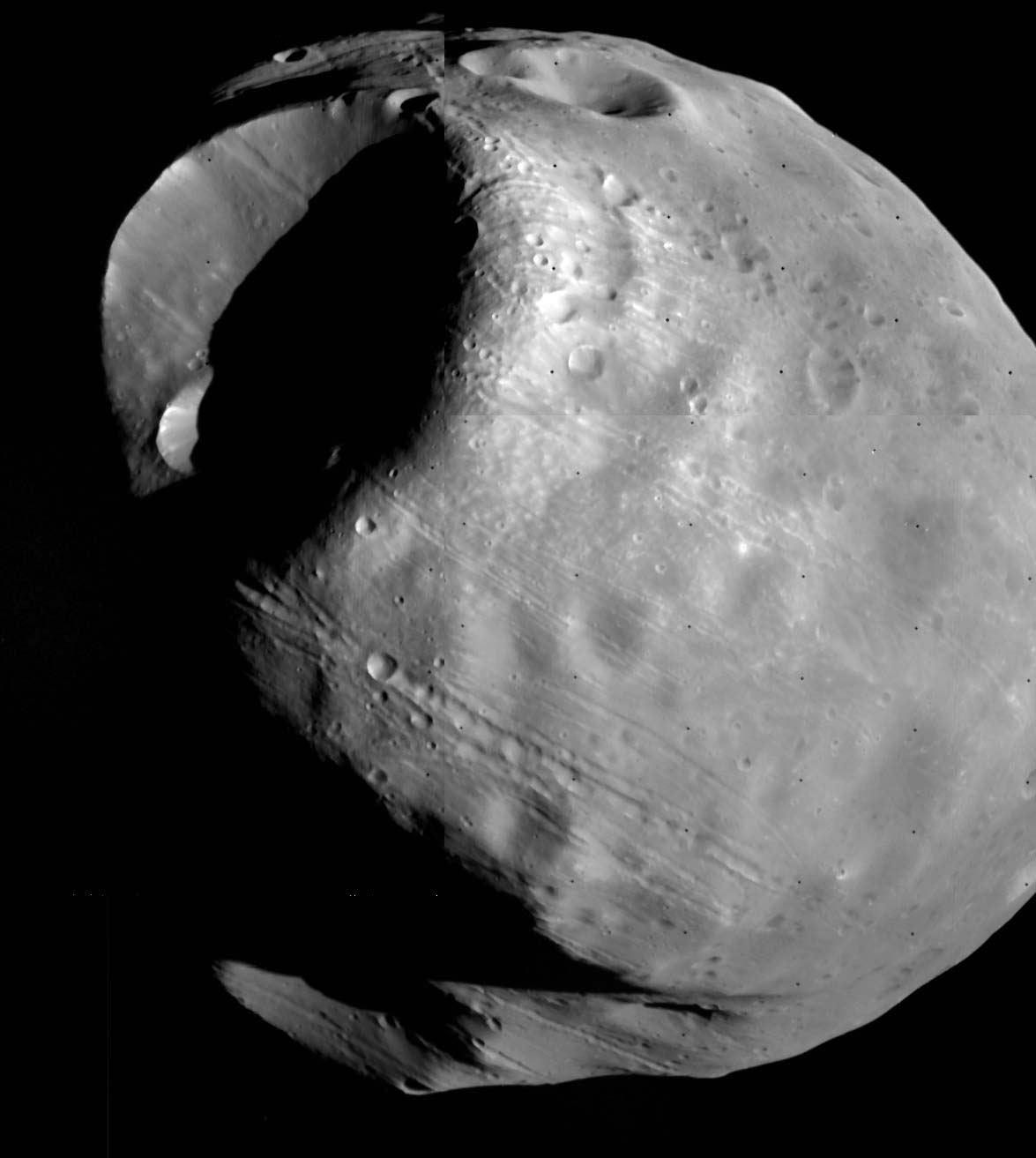
Phobos, a mosaic of images taken in 1978

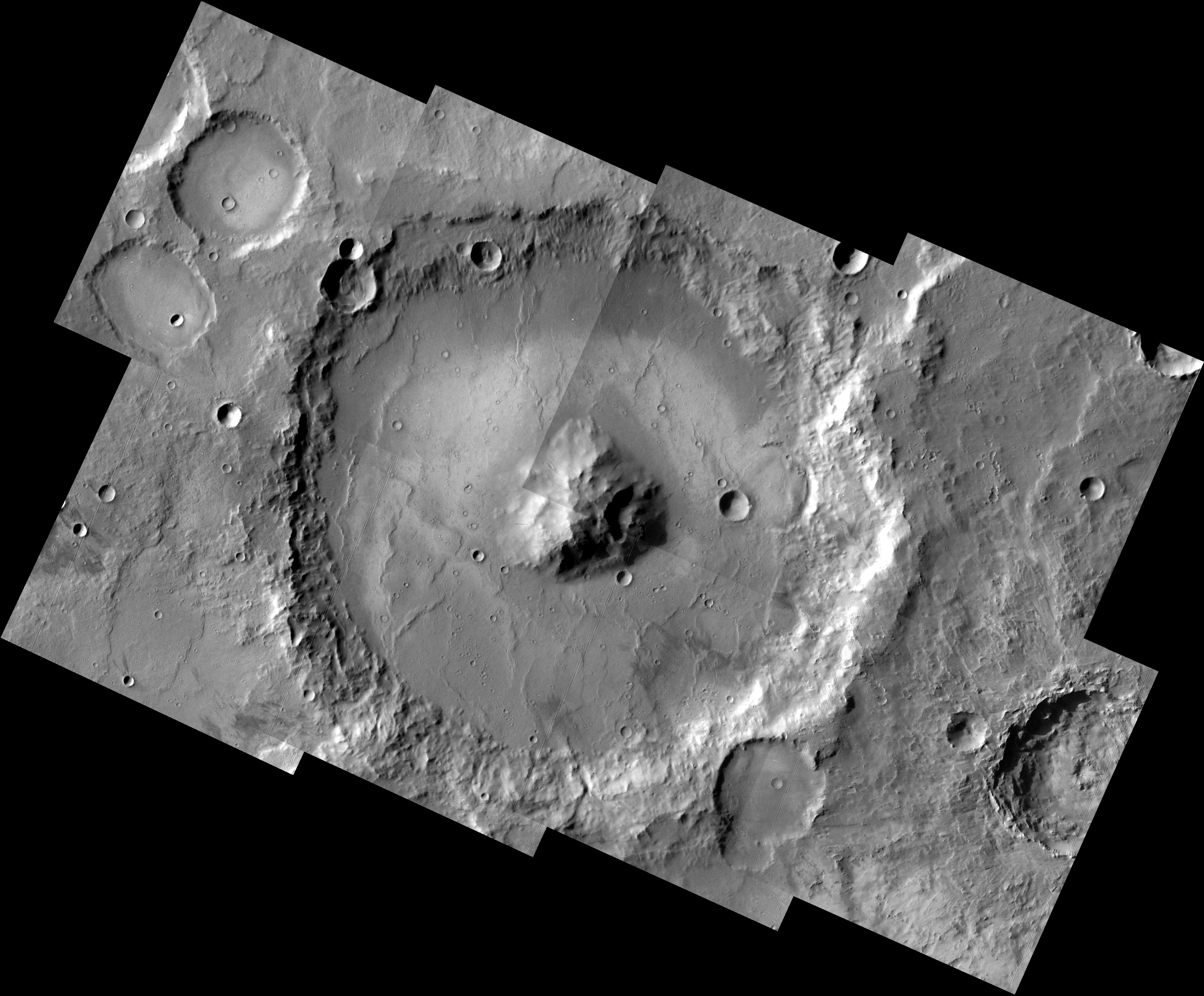
Mosaic of eight images showing Cobres crater

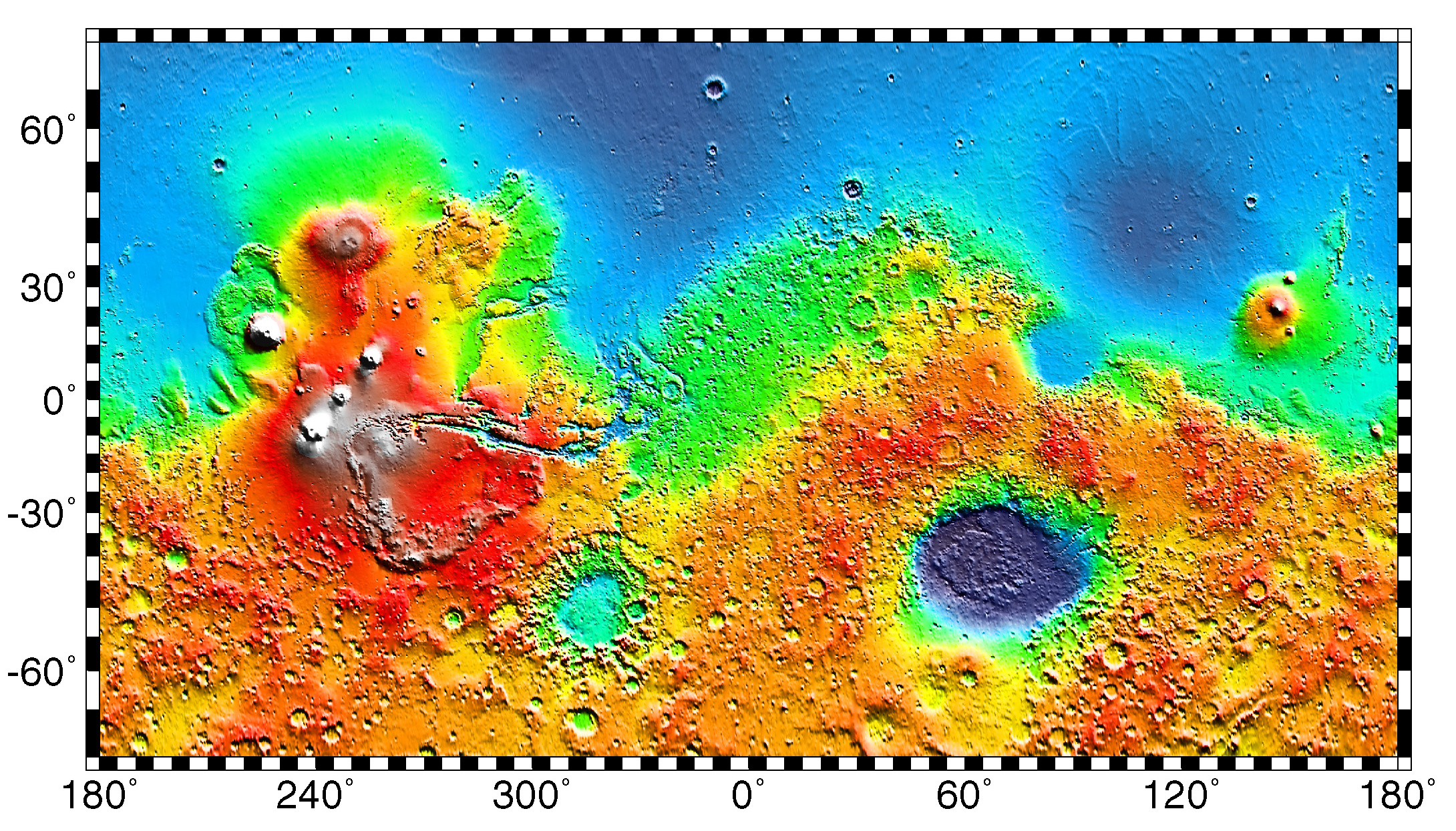

Interactive image map of the global topography of Mars, overlaid with the position of Martian rovers and landers. Orange indicates active rovers, coloring of the base map indicates relative elevations of Martian surface.

Clickable image: Clicking on the labels will open a new article.
( Active • Inactive)
(See also: Mars map; Mars Memorials list)

== See also ==
- Exploration of Mars
- List of missions to Mars
- List of Mars orbiters
- Timeline of artificial satellites and space probes
- Viking lander biological experiments
