= Albert Tyler (biologist) =

American biologist (1906–1968)

- Born: Albert Titlebaum; June 26, 1906; Brooklyn, New York City, U.S.
- Died: November 9, 1968 (aged 62)
- Education: Columbia University
- Scientific career
- Fields: Biology
- Workplaces: California Institute of Technology

Albert Tyler (born Albert Titlebaum; June 26, 1906 – November 9, 1968) was an American biologist whose research was focused on reproductive biology and development in marine organisms.

Tyler was born in Brooklyn, New York. He attended Columbia University majoring in chemistry. When he started graduate studies he took interest in the work of Thomas Hunt Morgan. Morgan took Tyler, and several other graduate students and research fellows with him, to the California Institute of Technology when he was hired to establish the new Division of Biology. Tyler completed his Ph.D. studies on reproductive biology and was appointed to the faculty at Caltech.

Tyler's research looked at development and differentiation of embryos from a range of marine organisms. He made early use of immunohistochemical techniques and was one of the first researchers to recognize that maternal messenger RNA present in the ovum could affect differentiation. His research on nucleic acid and protein synthesis in sea urchin eggs was cut short when he died unexpectedly in 1968.

== Bibliography ==
- Metz, C. B. 1969. An appreciation of Albert Tyler. Biology of Reproduction 1:119
- Pauling, L. 1970. Albert Tyler. Developmental Biology 21:3–12
