= Patricia Ann Straat =

American space scientist (1936–2020)

- Born: March 28, 1936
- Died: October 23, 2020 (aged 84)
- Education: Oberlin College; Johns Hopkins University
- Scientific career
- Fields: Astrochemistry, Biochemistry, and Biophysics
- Workplaces: National Institutes of Health
- Thesis: Characterization of a nitrate reductase from the chemoautotroph Nitrobacter agilis (1964)

Patricia Ann Straat (March 28, 1936 – October 23, 2020) was an American space scientist. She was a co-investigator for the Labeled Release life detection experiment on the 1976 Viking mission, the first successful spacecraft landing on Mars. She was also part of the spectroscopy experiment team on the 1971 Mariner 9 mission to Mars. In 2019, Straat wrote the book To Mars With Love, which documented the 1976 Viking Mission to Mars.

== Early life and education ==
Straat was born in Rochester, New York. She attended Irondequoit High School. Her parents were Marcelline and Harold Straat, and her father was an optical engineer. She has said that she became interested in space as a child, and could name all of the constellations in her night sky by the age of 12. Straat earned her undergraduate degree at Oberlin College, a liberal arts school in Ohio. She moved to Johns Hopkins University for her graduate studies, where she specialized in biochemistry.

== Research and career ==
Straat worked as a U.S. Public Health Service Postdoctoral Fellow at Johns Hopkins University and was promoted to Assistant Professor in 1968. Straat worked on molecular biology and enzymes. She said that the Moon landing reminded her of her childhood love for space, and began to consider changing career.

A few months later, Straat was headhunted by Gilbert Levin, who had recently been successful in proposing an experiment for a NASA mission to Mars. Straat was involved with the Viking Mission, and worked alongside Levin on the Labeled Release (LR) experiment. In 1970 Straat joined Biospherics Inc, a spin-out company owned by Levin, where she worked as a biochemist. Together they searched for organic gases in the Martian atmosphere. She spent her first few years at Biospherics Inc developing science and hardware. The Viking Mission landed on Mars in 1976, with the landed release mission starting ten days after Viking landed. The mission mixed small samples of soil from Mars with drops of water that contained nutrients tagged with Carbon-14 in a chamber. Measurements were then made of the atmosphere of the internal chamber: if they detected the evolution of radioactive ^{14}CO_{2}, microorganisms in the soil must have metabolized the nutrients. When the soil sample showed positive results, and a heat-sterilized control sample returned negative results, the scientific community was surprised. Straat and Levin believed that their labeled release results showed indications of microbial life on Mars.

After a decade at Biospherics Inc, Straat joined the National Institutes of Health, where she held various leadership positions, including overseeing the referral section.

In 2019 Straat wrote the book To Mars With Love, which documented the 1976 Viking Mission to Mars. The journal Astrobiology described To Mars With Love as a “remarkable book, by a remarkable woman, about a remarkable instrument on the most remarkable mission ever to go to Mars,”.

== Selected publications ==
- Levin, Gilbert V.; Straat, Patricia Ann (1977). "Recent results from the Viking Labeled Release Experiment on Mars". Journal of Geophysical Research. 82 (28): 4663–4667. Bibcode:1977JGR....82.4663L. doi:10.1029/JS082i028p04663. ISSN 2156-2202.
- Levin, Gilbert V.; Straat, Patricia Ann (17 December 1976). "Viking Labeled Release Biology Experiment: Interim Results". Science. 194 (4271): 1322–1329. Bibcode:1976Sci...194.1322L. doi:10.1126/science.194.4271.1322. ISSN 0036-8075. PMID 17797094. S2CID 24206165.
- Levin, Gilbert V.; Ann Straat, Patricia (1976). "Labeled release ? An experiment in radiorespirometry". Origins of Life. 7 (3): 293–311. Bibcode:1976OrLi....7..293L. doi:10.1007/bf00926948. ISSN 0302-1688. PMID 1012719. S2CID 27086535.

== Personal life ==
Straat was a lifelong equestrian, and in her retirement trained her King Charles Spaniel Piper, bringing home numerous prizes. Straat suffered from lung cancer and died in October 2020. She was survived by her partner Mary Grande.
