= Ptolemaeus (Martian crater) =

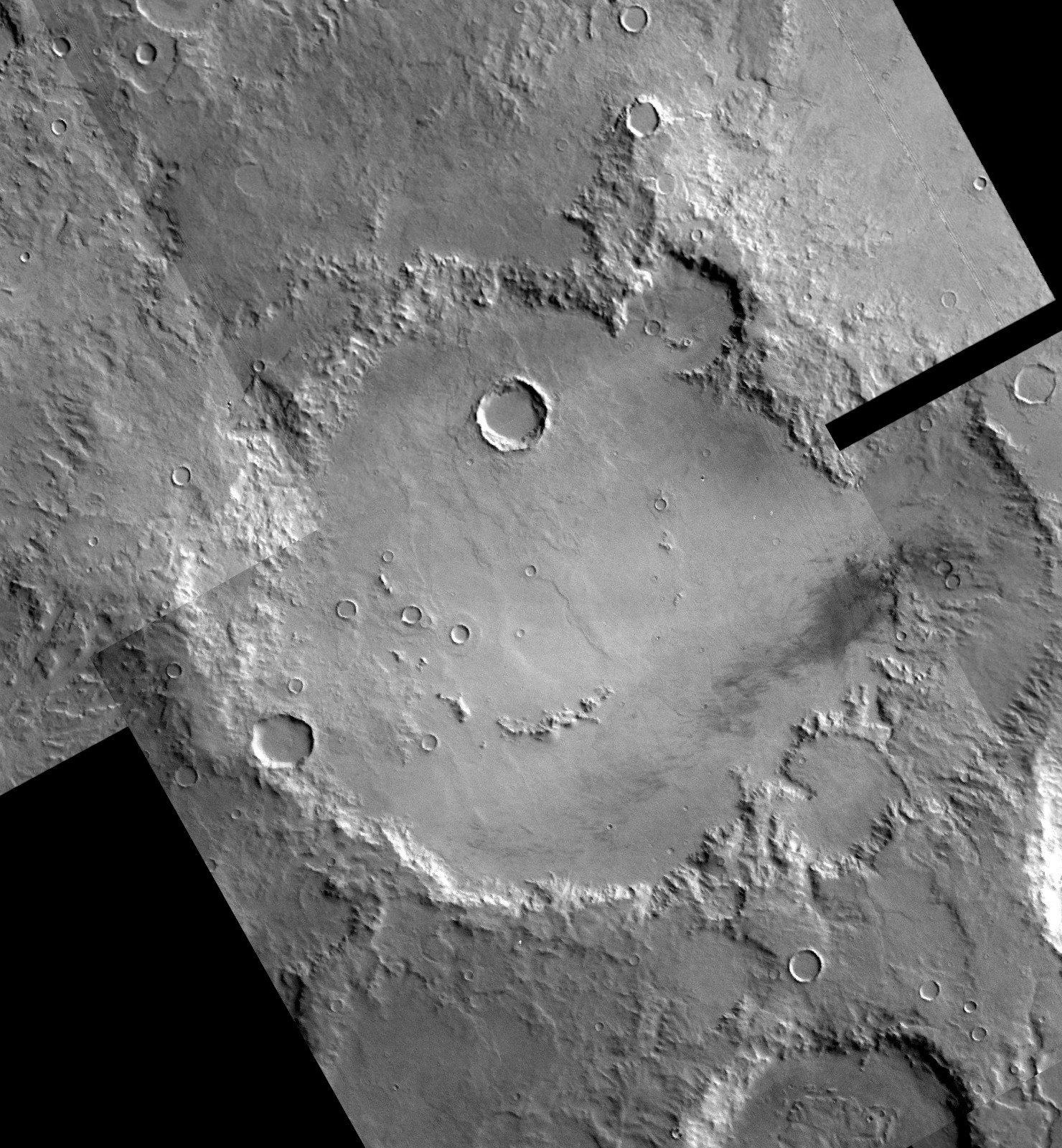
- Viking Orbiter 1 mosaic
- Planet: Mars
- Coordinates: 45.88°S 157.6°W
- Quadrangle: Phaethontis
- Diameter: 165.18 km (102.64 mi)
- Eponym: Claudius Ptolemaeus, a Greco-Egyptian astronomer (c. AD 90-160)

Ptolemaeus is a crater on Mars, found in the Phaethontis quadrangle. It measures approximately 165 kilometers in diameter and was named after Claudius Ptolemaeus (Ptolemy), the Greco-Egyptian astronomer (c. AD 90-160).

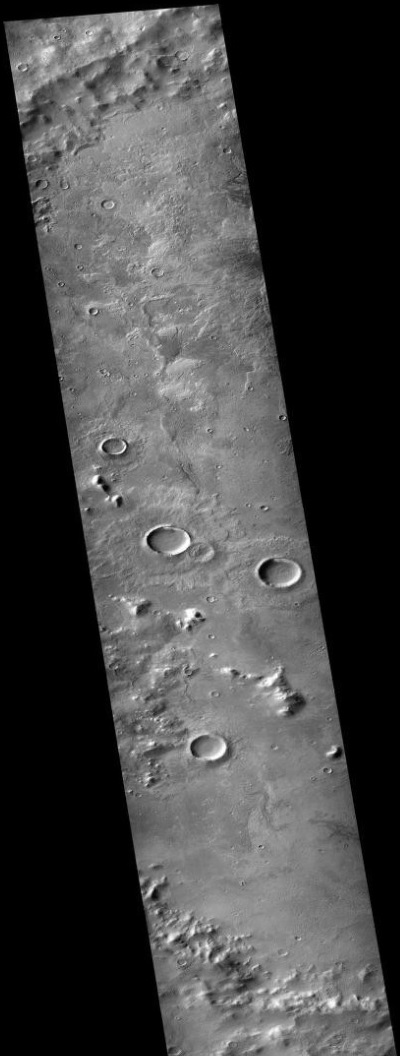
Portion of Ptolemaeus crater, as seen by CTX camera (on MRO). Parts of the North and south rim are visible—at top and bottom of photo.

The Soviet probe Mars 3 is thought to have successfully landed in Ptolemaeus crater on 2 December 1971, but contact was lost seconds after landing due to a dust storm occurring at the time. On 11 April 2013, NASA announced that the Mars Reconnaissance Orbiter (MRO) may have imaged the Mars 3 lander hardware on the surface of Mars. The HiRISE camera on the MRO took images of what may be the parachute, retrorockets, heat shield and lander.

== Ice-rich mantle ==
Much of the surface of Mars is covered by a thick smooth mantle that is thought to be a mixture of ice and dust. This ice-rich mantle, a few yards thick, smooths the land, but in places it has a bumpy texture, resembling the surface of a basketball. Under certain conditions the ice could melt and flow down the slopes to create gullies. Because there are few craters on this mantle, the mantle is relatively young. An excellent view of this mantle is shown below in the picture of the Ptolemaeus crater rim, as seen by HiRISE.

Changes in Mars's orbit and tilt cause significant changes in the distribution of water ice from polar regions down to latitudes equivalent to Texas. During certain climate periods water vapor leaves polar ice and enters the atmosphere. The water comes back to ground at lower latitudes as deposits of frost or snow mixed generously with dust. The atmosphere of Mars contains a great deal of fine dust particles. Water vapor will condense on the particles, then fall down to the ground due to the additional weight of the water coating. When ice at the top of the mantling layer goes back into the atmosphere, it leaves behind dust, which insulating the remaining ice.

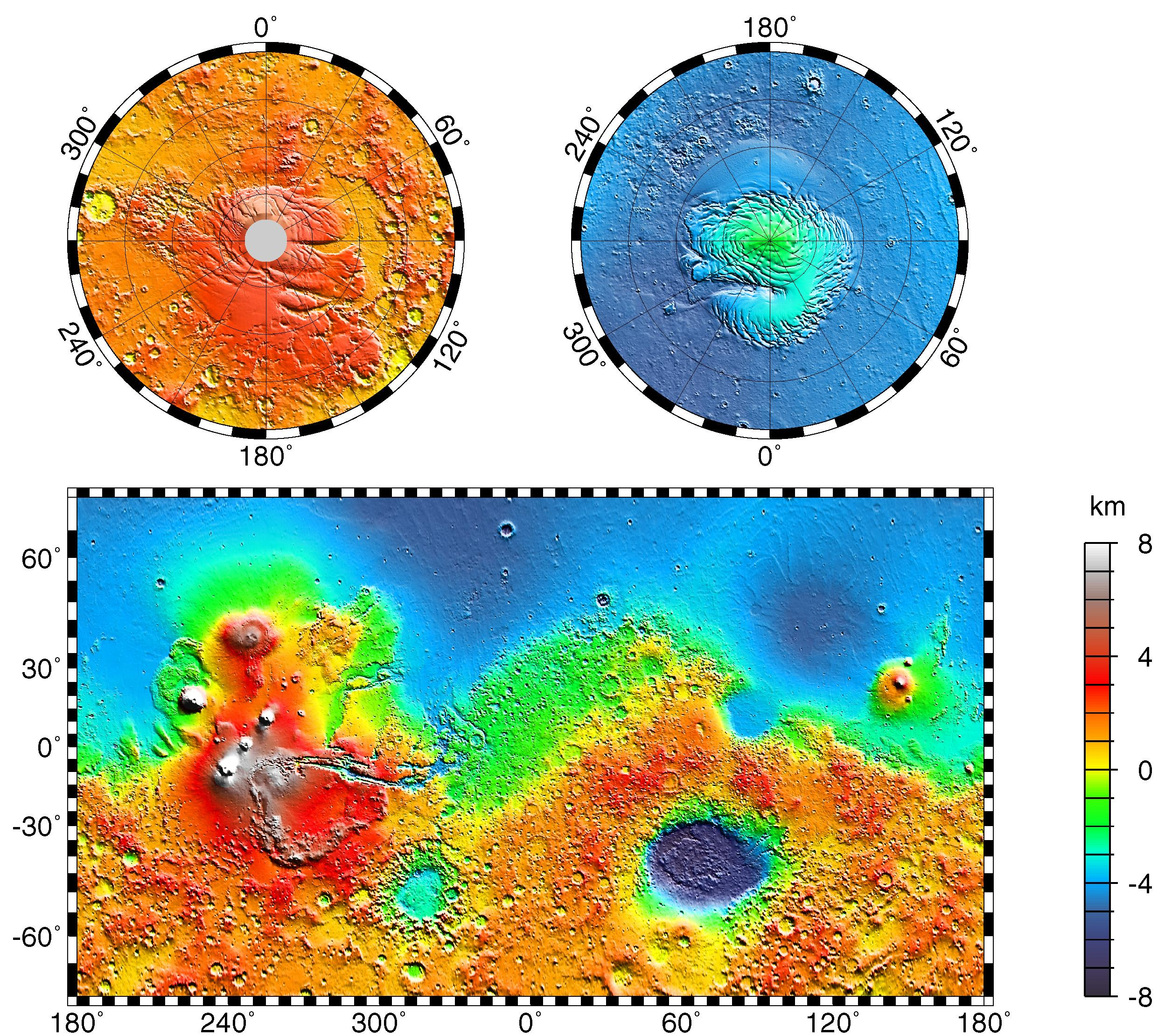
This topographic map shows volcanic peaks in white because of their great height. Near the equator, a line of three volcanoes points south to Phaethontis and three large craters-the area where there are many gullies.

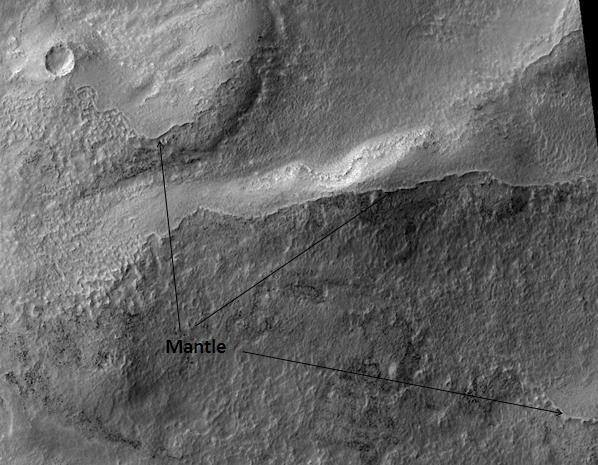
Ptolemaeus crater rim, as seen by HiRISE. Click on image to see excellent view of mantle deposit.

== See also ==
- List of craters on Mars: O-Z
