= Gilbert Levin =

American engineer (1924–2021)

Gilbert Victor Levin (April 23, 1924 – July 26, 2021) was an American engineer, the founder of Biospherics and the principal investigator of the Viking mission Labeled Release experiment. He was born in Baltimore, Maryland, to a Jewish family; his father was an immigrant from Lithuania.

In 1997, Levin published his conclusion that a 1976 Viking lander had discovered living microorganisms on Mars. He is noted for still claiming that his experiment on board the 1976 Viking Mars landers to detect microscopic life on Mars rendered a true positive result. On April 12, 2012, an international team including Levin reported their analysis "support the interpretation that the Viking LR experiment did detect extant microbial life on Mars." The team used cluster analysis of the Labeled Release experiments of the Viking program.

He was one of the science advisers of the International Committee Against Mars Sample Return.

He also patented an inexpensive method to make tagatose, an artificial sweetener, in 1988.

Levin died in Bethesda, Maryland after an aortic dissection on July 26, 2021, at the age of 97.

== Publications ==
- Can Chirality Give Proof of Extinct or Extant Life?

== See also ==
- Extraterrestrial life
