= XHARJ-TV =

Former television station in Arandas, Jalisco

Arandas, Jalisco; Mexico
- Channels: Analog: 22 (UHF)
- Branding: Televisión Alteña

Programming
- Affiliations: Independent

Ownership
- Owner: Asociación Cultural Arandina, A.C.

History
- Founded: May 1, 1994; November 1, 2000 (permit awarded)
- Call sign meaning: Arandas Jalisco

Technical information
- ERP: Analog: .597 kW
- Transmitter coordinates: 20°42′43.80″N 102°20′15.80″W

Links
- Website: TV Alteña

XHARJ-TV was a local television station in Arandas, Jalisco. Broadcasting on analog channel 22, XHARJ was branded as TV Alteña and offered a schedule featuring several local programs including news (under the title CNR Noticias).

== History ==
Televisión Alteña's roots date to 1994, when programming began on cable channel 3 with one hour weekly on Sundays. For two years, the hour was filled with ten-minute prerecorded programs.

On November 1, 2000, the permit for XHARJ-TV, a low-powered television station in Arandas, was obtained. This allowed the station to expand to neighboring communities and increase its viewership. The permit expired in March 2005.

In June 2015, given that a permit renewal had never been sought for the station, the permit was terminated.
