= Arandas, Jalisco =

Arandas
- Municipality and city
- Municipality of Arandas
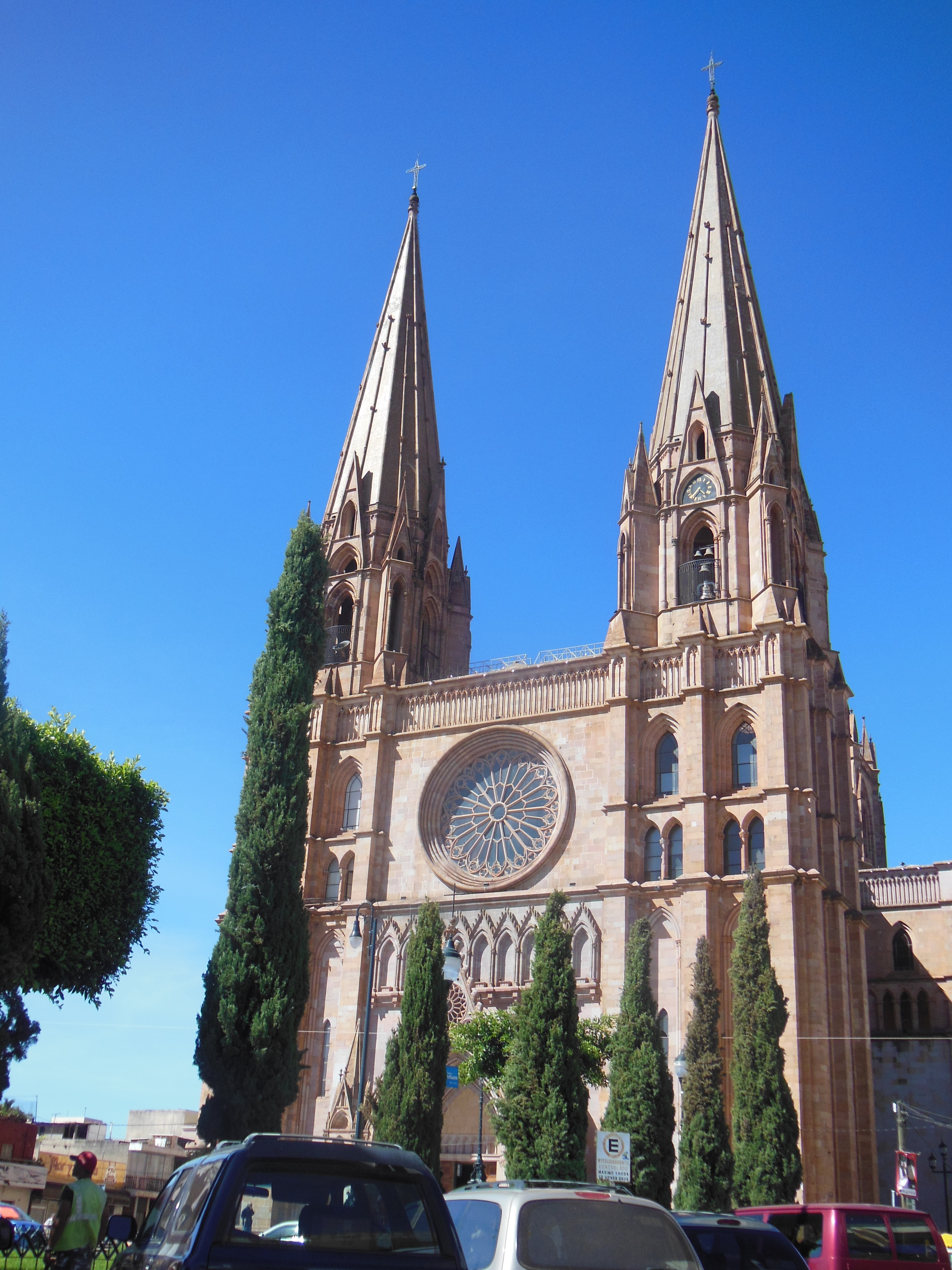
- Parroquia de San José Obrero: Arandas Landmark

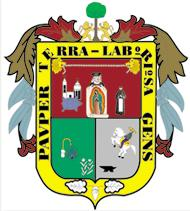
- Coat of arms
- Nicknames: Tierra del Tequila, Tierra Colorada
- Motto: "Tierra Pobre, Gente Laboriosa" (Spanish) "Poor land, hardworking people"
- Coordinates: 20°42′15″N 102°20′46″W
- Country: Mexico
- State: Jalisco
- Geographic and Cultural Region: Los Altos de Jalisco
- Settled: 1544
- Founded: 1761

Government
  - Type: Mayor and Council System
  - Mayor: Ana Isabel Bañuelos Ramírez
  - Political party: Citizens' Movement

Area
  - Municipality: 949.9 km^{2} (366.8 sq mi)
  - City: 13.83 km^{2} (5.34 sq mi)
- Elevation: 2,061 m (6,762 ft)

Population (2020 census)
  - Municipality: 80,609
  - Rank: 13th out of 125 in Jalisco
  - Density: 62.3/km^{2} (161/sq mi)
  - City: 59,648
- Time zone: UTC-6 (Central (US Central))
- Postal code: 47180
- Area code: 348
- Köppen Climate Classification: Subtropical Highland Oceanic Climate (Cwb)
- Website: http://www.arandas.gob.mx

Arandas is a municipality of the Altos Sur region of the state of Jalisco in Mexico. Arandas is also the name of the municipality's main township and the center of the municipal government. The city centre is located approximately 86 miles (138 km) east of Guadalajara, the state capital. Arandas is accessible to residents of Guadalajara by the Mexican Federal Highway 80D and Jalisco State Highway 314.

The population of the town of Arandas was 59,648 as of the 2020 census. The town's main plaza is named Plaza Hidalgo after Miguel Hidalgo y Costilla, known as the father of Mexico's war of independence. The municipality's population as of the census of 2015 was 77,116 and its area was 949.9 km^{2} (366.8 sq mi); however, both of these figures have been significantly reduced since 2007 with the creation of the municipality of San Ignacio Cerro Gordo from the western part of what was formerly part of the Arandas municipality. San Ignacio Cerro Gordo was the second-largest community in the municipality before the split, with a population of 9,485 inhabitants, but the largest remaining community besides the city of Arandas is Santa María del Valle, with a population of 4,285 (2020 census).

Arandas is situated on the Mesa Central at an elevation of 6,762 feet (2,061 metres). Arandas is commonly known among Mexicans as the commercial and manufacturing centre for agricultural products (typically beans and wheat) and its pastoral environment, which allows the city to produce various commercial products such as linseed oil, tequila, pottery, woollen blankets, and straw hats.

== Local toponymy ==
The name is derived from the original name the existing population received during the 17th century: Santa María de Guadalupe de los Aranda, which was derived from the last name Aranda, one of the founding families; along with Camarena and Hernández Gamiño.

== History ==
Originally, the region was barely inhabited by the Chichimeca and the Purépecha people. To show the origin of this community more extensively, the past was excavated and information was linked together until reaching its institutional origin that dates to July 2, 1544, the year that both New Spain's viceroy Don Antonio de Mendoza, as the governor of Nueva Galicia Francisco Vázquez de Coronado, they gave in a series of land bonds to Spanish captain Juan de Villaseñor y Orozco, which by its vast land area became a large estate (40.000 square km) achieved due to his enormous labour both, in the early days of the conquest, as well as a reward for his great strategies during the Mixton war.

On November 14, 1824, Arandas became part of the Atotonilco department. On April 8, 1844, the council was established. On July 9, 1875, Arandas became elevated to municipality status and on September 17, it was raised to town status, but belonged to the La Barca department. On August 23, 1969, Arandas became recognized as a city by then governor of Jalisco, Francisco Medina Ascencio.

From 1926 to 1929, the Cristero War took place and Arandas was a focal during the war because of the strong religious sentiments of the population.

The crater Arandas, on the planet Mars, was named after the city since 1976, when the International Astronomical Union agreed to put it in honour of the city. Arandas Crater is estimated to be 24.8 km (15.4 miles) in diameter. Arandas is located within the Mare Acidalium Quadrangle to the Northeast of Chryse Planitia in the Northern Plains of Mars and is one of the classic examples of a double-layered ejecta crater. The Arandas crater was one of the first DLE craters studied following the start of the Viking Orbiter missions in the late 1970s.

== Demography ==
According to the 2005 Second Count of Population and Housing, the city has 80,193 inhabitants, of which 38,171 are males and 42,022 are women; 0.56% of the population are of Indigenous backgrounds. In 2015, the population in Arandas was composed of 49% men and 51% women. The city has seen a sharp demographic rise in recent years to its growing agricultural sector and economic opportunities. Compared to 2010, the population in Arandas increased by 10.7%. Around 60% of the population is of European origin mostly of Spanish and French descent. The Municipality has an Afro-Descendant population of 599, approximately 0.78% of the city's population, this population descends from victims of the slave trade in Latin America perpetuated by the New Spanish regime.

The age range of Arandas residents that concentrates the largest population were 15 to 19 years (7,738 inhabitants), 5 to 9 years (7,441 inhabitants), and 10 to 14 years (7,321 inhabitants). Among them, they concentrated 27.9% of the total population.

Sex	Age range	Population	Percentage of total population (%)
Male	0 to 4 years	3592	4.46
Male	5 to 9 years	3870	4.80
Male	10 to 14 years	3727	4.62
Male	15 to 19 years	3912	4.85
Male	20 to 24 years	3304	4.10
Male	25 to 29 years	2966	3.68
Male	30 to 34 years	2865	3.55
Male	35 to 39 years	2805	3.48
Male	40 to 44 years	2526	3.13
Male	45 to 49 years	2307	2.86
Male	50 to 54 years	1938	2.40
Male	55 to 59 years	1600	1.98
Male	60 to 64 years	1336	1.66
Male	65 to 69 years	907	1.13
Male	70 to 74 years	726	0.90
Male	75 to 79 years	506	0.63
Male	80 to 84 years	359	0.45
Male	85 or more years	246	0.31

Sex	Age range	Population	Percentage of total population (%)
Female	0 to 4 years	3513	4.36
Female	5 to 9 years	3571	4.43
Female	10 to 14 years	3594	4.46
Female	15 to 19 years	3826	4.75
Female	20 to 24 years	3480	4.32
Female	25 to 29 years	3089	3.83
Female	30 to 34 years	3227	4.00
Female	35 to 39 years	3106	3.85
Female	40 to 44 years	2774	3.44
Female	45 to 49 years	2488	3.09
Female	50 to 54 years	2192	2.72
Female	55 to 59 years	1738	2.16
Female	60 to 64 years	1410	1.75
Female	65 to 69 years	1121	1.39
Female	70 to 74 years	763	0.95
Female	75 to 79 years	554	0.69
Female	80 to 84 years	350	0.43
Female	85 or more years	321	0.40

=== Diversity of the person of reference or head of the household ===
According to data from the Population Census 2020, 22.8k dwellings were registered, with an average of 3.4 individuals per household. Of these, 31.4% are homes where the person of reference is a woman and 68.6% corresponds to homes where the person of reference is a man. Regarding the age ranges of the person of reference, 11.9% of the dwellings are concentrated heads of households between 35 and 39 years.

=== Languages ===
The principal and main language of Arandas is Spanish, it is the language of trade and commerce in addition to the language most commonly spoken in the everyday lives of residents. The number of speakers of indigenous languages has declined since the colonial era through genocide, cultural assimilation and policies enacted by the Spanish Empire and New Spain. However, some indigenous languages continue to be spoken within Arandas and the Greater Los Altos region. The population that's able to fluently speak one indigenous language was 261 inhabitants, which corresponds to 0.32% of the total population of Arandas. The most widely spoken indigenous dialects were Tzeltal (233 inhabitants), Náhuatl (10 inhabitants), Zapoteco (9 inhabitants) and Tarasco (9 inhabitants). Purépecha speakers also exist within the city, although the official number is unknown. These speakers descend from the Tzeltal, Nahuas, Zapotec, Purépecha and Tarasco people that have inhabited the Jalisco province since the Pre-Columbian era.

Many European languages are also spoken within the city as around 60% of the population is of European origin mostly of Spanish and French descent.

=== Immigration ===
Immigration to the Los Altos de Jalisco region of Mexico has increased due to the rising economic opportunities that the region gives. Arandas specifically, is a rising residence for immigrants due to its proximity to Guadalajara, the state capital and the seventh-largest city in Mexico. The largest number of migrants who entered Arandas in the last 5 years came from the United States (338 people), Canada (30 people), and South Korea (18 people). The main causes of migration to Arandas in recent years were family (191 people), labour (95 people), and living place (38 people).

=== Inequality ===
The Gini coefficient of Arandas is 0.41. The Gini coefficient or Gini index is a statistical measure designed to represent the income distribution of the inhabitants, specifically, the inequality between them. Indices closer to 0, represent more equity among its inhabitants, while values close to 1, express maximum inequity among its population. This makes Arandas one of the municipalities in Jalisco with the lowest social inequality. In 2015, in Jalisco, the municipalities with the lowest social inequality, according to the GINI index, were: Tonila (0.359), Tonaya (0.363), Acatlán de Juárez (0.366), Ixtlahuacán de los Membrillos (0.372), and San Gabriel (0.374). On the other hand, the municipalities with less social equality by this metric were: Mezquitic (0.640), Bolaños (0.532), Villa Guerrero (0.468), Quitupan (0.458), and Huejuquilla el Alto (0.457).

== Economy ==
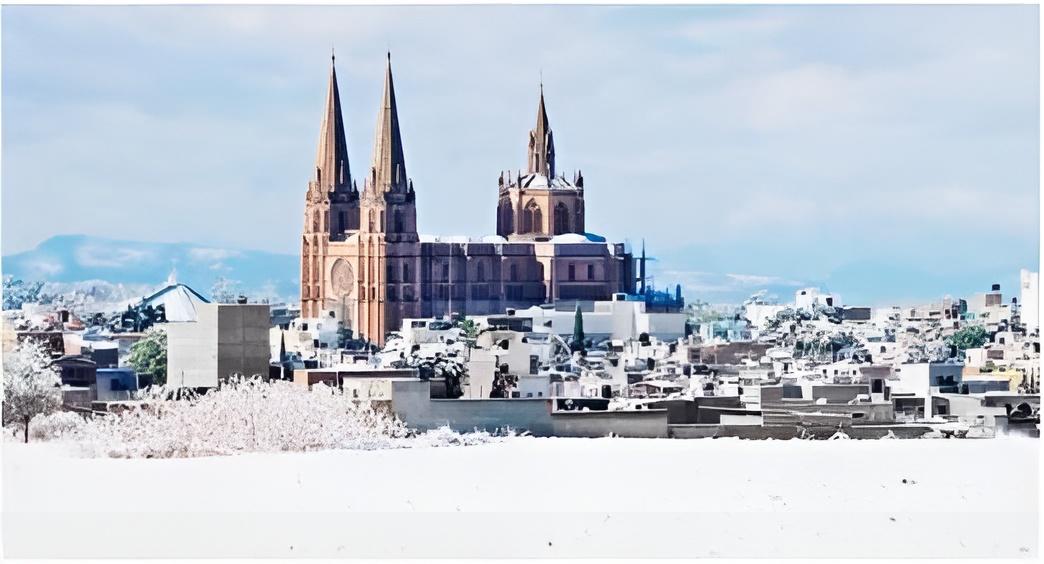
Panoramic of Arandas after snowfall in 2016.

The economy of Arandas is centred around the production of goods and services, particularly the production of agricultural goods. Arandas has had unprecedented macroeconomic stability, with one of the highest per capita incomes of Jalisco municipalities, especially with the Los Altos Region. The International sales of Arandas in 2020 totalled US$4.41M, -0.37% less than the previous year.

According to data from the Economic Census 2019, the economic sectors that concentrated the most economic units in Arandas were Retail Trade (1,991 units), Other Services except Government Activities (662 units), and Temporary Accommodation and Food Preparation and Drinks (507 units).

Economic sector	Economic units
"Agriculture, animal husbandry and exploitation, forestry, fishing and hunting"	4
"Generation, transmission and distribution of electricity, water and gas pipeline to the consumer"	1
"Building"	17
"Manufacturing industries"	458
"To the wholesale trade"	171
"Retail trade"	1991
"Transportation and storage"	4
"Mass media information"	8
"Financial and insurance services"	17
"Real estate and rental services of furniture and intangible assets"	46
"Services professionals, scientists and technicals"	146
"Support services to business and waste management and waste and remediation services"	50
"Educational services"	36
"Health and social assistance services"	232
"Leisure and cultural services, sports, and other recreational services"	50
"Temporary accommodation and food preparation and drinks"	507
"Other services except government activities"	662

=== Main imports and exports ===
The products with the highest level of international sales in 2020 were Plastics Articles for the Conveyance or Packing of Goods (US$3.71M), Containers of Glass of a Kind Used for the Conveyance or Packing of Goods (US$590k), and Boxes, Sacks, Bags and other Paper Packaging (US$66.9k). International purchases of Arandas in 2020 were US$2.45M, -81.8% less than the previous year. The products with the highest level of international purchases in 2020 were Machinery and Apparatus for Soldering, Brazing, Welding, Gas-Operated Surface Tempering Machines and Appliances (US$694k), Machinery and Mechanical Appliances Having Individual Functions, not Specified Elsewhere (US$472k), and Labels of all Kinds, Paper or Paperboard, whether or not Printed (US$302k). As of June 2021, the annual international sales of Arandas totalled US$19.2M and the international purchases totalled US$4.96M, a balance of US$14.24M.

International sales of goods	Trade value (USD)	Growth percentage (%)
Plates, Sheets and Strip, Noncellular and not Reinforced	10746	-0.46
Plastics Articles for the Conveyance or Packing of Goods	3706929	0.55
Barrels, Vats, Tubs and other Coopers' Products and Parts Thereof, of Wood, Including Staves	35000	174.00
Boxes, Sacks, Bags and other Paper Packaging	66856	-0.66
Containers of Glass of a Kind Used for the Conveyance or Packing of Goods	589892	-0.66

International purchases of goods for Arandas	Trade value (USD)	Growth percentage (%)
The Articles of Plastics and Articles of other Materials	76651	0.02
Boxes, Sacks, Bags and other Paper Packaging	235597	-0.01
Labels of all Kinds, Paper or Paperboard, whether or not Printed	301810	-0.06
Pipe Fittings (For Example Couplings (Fittings), Elbows, Sleeves), of Iron or Steel	28121	0.09
Screws, Bolts, Nuts and Similar Articles	6844	-0.38
Other Articles of Iron or Steel	16980	1.75
The Other Articles of Aluminum	26816	-0.03
Fittings and Similar Articles of Base Metal, for Furniture, Doors, Windows, Saddlery, Chests and other Articles of this Class	90117	0.38
Air Pumps or Vacuum Pumps	15098	-0.55
Apparatus for Filtering or Purifying Liquids or Gases	4458	-0.68
Machines Used for Printing and other Printing Components	134439	0.94
Machinery and Mechanical Appliances Having Individual Functions, not Specified Elsewhere	471697	-0.04
Valves and Similar Articles for Pipes, Vats or the Like, Including Pressure-Reducing Valves and Thermostatically Controlled Valves	9424	2.46
Axles and Cranks; Bearings, Bearing Housings and other Speed Changers	73436	3.91
Motors and Generators	196338	0.72
Power Transformers, Static Converters and Inductors	33088	1.70
Machinery and Apparatus for Soldering, Brazing, Welding, Gas-Operated Surface Tempering Machines and Appliances	694140	29.70
Electrical Apparatus for Switching or Protecting Electrical Circuits	13501	3.11
Boards, Consoles and other Bases for Electric Control or Distribution of Electricity	2643	-0.99
Electrical Wires and Cables	1905	-0.34

=== International sales destinations and purchases ===
The main international sales destinations in 2020 were the United States (US$4.24M), Nicaragua (US$127k), and El Salvador (US$27.5k) while the main countries of origin of international purchases in 2020 were China (US$921k), Belgium (US$618k), and the United States (US$568k).

Trade destination	Trade value (USD)	Growth percentage (%)
Belgium	263	
Canada	12	-0.216
Dominican Republic	9529	-0.671
Guatemala	538	0.219
Nicaragua	127123	-0.113
El Salvador	27481	0.749
United States of America	4244477	0.559

Trade origin	Trade value (USD)	Growth percentage (%)
China	921426	-0.25
Hong Kong	155	98.19
Japan	872	-0.63
South Korea	3764	-0.13
Malaysia	200	
Turkey	1130	83.93
Taiwan	103681	1.12
Vietnam	1	-1.00
Austria	28250	-0.81
Belgium	618038	30.95
Germany	56727	-0.52
Spain	87081	-0.14
France	793	-0.86
Greece	3926	
Italy	14031	0.61
Poland	24	
Canada	30211	-0.76
The United States	568115	0.01

=== Foreign direct investment ===
Jalisco, particularly the Los Altos de Jalisco subregion (which includes Arandas), has received a lot of Foreign Direct Investment in the 21st century. In the period January to June 2021, FDI in Jalisco reached US$875M, distributed in reinvestment of earnings (US$542M), inter-company debts (US$202M), and equity capital (US$131M). From January 1999 and June 2021, Jalisco accumulates a total of US$625B in FDI, distributed in equity capital (US$15.4B), reinvestment of earnings (US$10.3B), and inter-company debts (US$8.85B). From January to June de 2021, the main origin countries of FDI in Jalisco were United States (US$301M), United Kingdom (US$209M), and Canada (US$90.2M). Between January 1999 and June 2021, the countries that have contributed the most to FDI are the United States (US$17.6B), Germany (US$2.98B), and Spain (US$2.9B).

Country	Investment (USD)
China	54009079
Japan	120497208
Switzerland	84574341
Germany	349362823
Denmark	20304611
Spain	265965240
France	-21620096
The United Kingdom	171816895
Ireland	-249706
Italy	17462328
Netherlands	123205765
Canada	342241669
Guatemala	170493
Panama	-100969
United States	466982513
Australia	3014946
Argentina	983582
Brazil	55169205
Chile	41852612
Colombia	4372832
Venezuela	3766647
Unknown	12368299

=== Poverty ===
In 2015, 38.9% of the population was in a situation of moderate poverty and 2.94% in extreme poverty. The vulnerable population due to social deprivation reached 36.8%, while the vulnerable population by income was 5.82%. Poverty rates in Arandas have decreased substantially since 2010 but economic challenges still persist for many inhabitants. The main social deficiencies of Arandas in 2015 were deprivation of social security, educational backwardness and deprivation of health services.

Year	Poverty type	Percentage in poverty (%)
2010	Moderate Poverty	42.6
2010	Extreme Poverty	7.4
2010	Vulnerable by Lacks	37.1
2010	Vulnerable by Income	4.7
2010	No Vulnerability	8.1
2015	Moderate Poverty	38.9
2015	Extreme Poverty	2.9
2015	Vulnerable by Lacks	36.8
2015	Vulnerable by Income	5.8
2015	No Vulnerability	15.5

Year	Social deficiency	Percentage of people living with social deficiency (%)
2010	Educational Backwardness	36.7
2010	Deprivation Quality Housing Spaces	4.4
2010	Deprivation Health Services	40.6
2010	Deprivation Social Security	75.2
2010	Deprivation Basic Services Housing	27.4
2010	Deprivation Basic Services Housing	10.7
2015	Educational Backwardness	30.0
2015	Deprivation Quality Housing Spaces	3.7
2015	Deprivation Health Services	22.6
2015	Deprivation Social Security	68.0

In 2020, 0.73% (592 people) of the population in Arandas had no access to sewage systems, 0.96% (776 people) did not have a water supply network, 0.64% (514 people) did not have a bathroom and 0.33% (266 people) did not have electricity. These figures have greatly reduced since 2000, due to economic growth, government spending by the Jalisco state governments of Francisco Javier Ramírez Acuña, Gerardo Octavio Solís Gómez, Emilio González Márquez, Aristóteles Sandoval and Enrique Alfaro Ramírez.

Absence of basic services	Percentage (%)	Year
No Water Supply Network	27.25	2000
No Electrical Energy	7.39	2000
No Toilet	14.35	2000
No Sewer System	15.38	2000

Absence of basic services	Percentage (%)	Year
No Water Supply Network	0.96	2020
No Electrical Energy	0.33	2020
No Toilet	0.64	2020
No Sewer System	0.73	2020

=== Labour ===
In the second quarter of 2021, the average labour participation rate in Jalisco and Arandas was 61.8%, which implied an increase of 1.15 percentage points compared to the previous quarter (60.6%). The unemployment rate was 3.36%, which implied a decrease of 0.36 percentage points compared to the previous quarter (3.72%). Aranda's rate of labour participation is 2.8% higher than the Mexican average, which as of the second quarter of 2021 is 59%. There exists a large discrepancy between male and female labour rates in Arandas and Jalisco, which is characteristic for Mexican states and cities. As of 2021, the labour participation rate for males is 78.7% and the rate for women is 46.5%. The unemployment rate for men in Arandas is 3.31% compared to 3.44% for women.

The average monthly salary in the second quarter of 2021 was $5.48k MX, $459 MX lower than the previous quarter ($5.94k MX). The average monthly salary for formal labour was $6.13k MX and for informal labour was $4.76k MX. 52.4% of the workforce is formally employed while 47.6% are informally employed, with men earning an average of $6.06k MX per month and the average women making $4.65k MX. In Jalisco, 10% of the lowest-income households (first decile) had an average quarterly income of $15k MX in 2020, while the 10% of households with the highest income (tenth decile) had an average quarterly income of $159k MX in the same period.

The occupations with the most workers during the second quarter of 2021 were Sales Employees, Dispatchers and Dependent on Trade, Traders in Stores, and Bricklayers, Stonemasons and Related.

== Quality of life ==
=== Distribution of homes by amount of rooms ===
In 2020, most inhabited private homes had 3 and 4 rooms, 35.4% and 31%, respectively. In the same period, the inhabited private homes with 2 and 3 bedrooms, 42.2% and 26.1%, respectively.

=== Services and connectivity in housing ===
Arandas ranks highly among the Municipalities of Jalisco and Mexican Municipalities in terms of the 5 major categories that dictate the quality of life of its residents. These five major categories include access to technologies, entertainment, availability of goods and availability of transport and equipment. As of 2020, 53.3% of Arandas residents have access to the internet, this figure is 12.3 percentage points below the world average, being 65.6%. 92% of Arandas residents have cellular devices like portable phones, a figure which ranks the city on the higher hand of Mexican municipalities, and only 0.6 percentage points below the world average. 70% of Households in Arandas have access to television, far below the Mexican average of 92.7%. However, Arandas's status as a particularly rural community reduces this figure. 14.3% of households within the municipality have access to a movie service and 11% have access to a gaming console. 59.3% of households have ready access to an oven, 89% have access to a washing machine and 94.6% of households have access to a fridge. Arandas's access to refrigerators is higher than the nationwide average as only 88 percent of households in Mexico had a refrigerator in use according to 2018 data.

Regarding transportation availability, 66.2% of households have automobiles which is significantly higher than the nationwide average of 48.43%. 34.3% of Arandas's households have motorcycles and 35.8% have bikes. Regarding access to equipment, 2.39% of houses in Arandas have solar panels, 50.5% have solar water heaters and 2.35% have access to air conditioning. The Mexican air conditioning penetration rate is 16%, meaning that Arandas falls on the low end of the spectrum for Mexican cities.

=== Travel time ===
In Arandas, the average travel time from home to work was 15.1 minutes and 89.8% of the population takes less than an hour to move, while 2.15% takes more than 1 hour to get to work. On the other hand, the average travel time from home to a place of study such as a school or university was 13.8 minutes, 95.4% of the population takes less than an hour to move, while 2.42% takes more than 1 hour. Arandas ranks higher than the Mexican average when it comes to travel time. 59.4% of employed Arandians arrive at work within 15 minutes or less, compared to 13.1% of Mexicans.

Time taken to arrive at Work	Arandas or Mexican average	Share (%)
"Up to 15 minutes"	"Arandas"	59. 4
"From 16 to 30 minutes"	"Arandas"	24.5
"From 31 minutes to 1 hour"	"Arandas"	5.8
"Between 1 to 2 hours"	"Arandas"	1.5
"More than 2 hours"	"Arandas"	0.7
"Doesn't move to work"	"Arandas"	8.1
"Up to 15 minutes"	"México"	30.1
"From 16 to 30 minutes"	"México"	26.8
"From 31 minutes to 1 hour"	"México"	20.2
"Between 1 to 2 hours"	"México"	8.8
"More than 2 hours"	"México"	2.4
"Doesn't move to work"	"México"	11.7

=== Means of transportation to work and school ===
In 2020, 60.6% of the population used bus, taxi, or similar as the main means of transportation to work. Regarding the means of transport to go to the place of study, 81.5% of the population used bus, taxi, or similar as the main means of transportation. Buses and taxis are the most efficient mode of transport for Arandas residents as 72% of individuals who commute to work in 15 minutes or fewer use buses and taxis as modes of transportation as well as 89.4% of people that travel to school. Travellers to Arandas can commute via various state highways, such as Jalisco State Highways 323, 314, 350, 307, 341 and 351 and the Mexican Federal 15D and 80D highways.

== Religion ==
78.78% of the population practice Roman Catholicism. However, there are also Evangelicals (Baptists and others) as well as Jehova's Witnesses, Mormons, and other religions. 20.15% of the inhabitants do not practice any religion.

== Tequila production ==
Arandas is the main tequila production center in the Los Altos region, one of the two main tequila producing regions in the state of Jalisco: the other being the municipality of Tequila, Jalisco. Arandas is home to the La Alteña distillery, one of the most well-known and respected distilleries of tequila producing brands such as El Tesoro De Don Felipe. Widely renowned for using traditional production methods such as roasting agave in brick ovens, without the use of flavour additives, diffusers, or autoclaves employed by lesser quality brands. At the entrance of the town, there is a landmark monument that signals the entrance to the Centinela distillery (followed by another monument dedicated to the city's founder). Organically grown agave for tequila is produced in the village of Agua Negra, about 16 miles from Arandas.

== Facts about Arandas, Jalisco ==
- Tequila is one of the best-selling products in Arandas.
- The most exported products from Arandas are Cazadores, Centinela, Carrera and Tapatío tequilas.
- Arandas has French, Italian, and Spanish communities.
- San Jose Obrero, currently the largest church in Arandas, has Romanesque-Gothic style architecture and one of the biggest bells in North America.
- On July 5, 2013, construction began on a new 18-bed "regional" hospital.
- A Mars Crater was named Arandas by The International Astronomical Union in 1976 in order to bring honour to the city.

== Notable people ==
- Juan Pablo Orozco, Mexican footballer (Club Atlético Zacatepec, Ascenso MX)
- Juan Carlos Martínez Camarena, Mexican footballer (Deportivo Marquense, Liga Nacional de Fútbol de Guatemala)
- José Luis Valle Magaña, Mexican politician
- Alicia Cervantes, Mexican footballer (C.D. Guadalajara Femenil, Liga MX Femenil)
- Oscar Saavedra, Mexican footballer (Central Texas Lobos FC, Gulf Coast Premier League)

== Government ==
=== Municipal presidents ===
Municipal president	Term	Political party	Notes
Antonio Valadez Ramírez	1914–1917		
José María López González	1918		
José Sainz Orozco	1919		
José María López González	1920		
J. Jesús Cuéllar	1920		
José Antonio Morales	1921		
Manuel B. Ascencio	1922		
Macedonio S. Barrera	1922		
Flavio Ramírez Álvarez	1923		
Indalecio Ramírez Ascencio	1924–1927		
Juan José Morales Hernández	1929	PNR	
Macedonio S. Barreras	1930	PNR	
Rafael Hernández Guzmán	1931	PNR	
Adrián Aguirre Patiño	1931	PNR	
José Torres Pérez Vargas	1932	PNR	
Pablo Camarena Jiménez	1933	PNR	
Antonio H. González	1935	PNR	
Salvador Álvarez Valencia	1937	PNR	
Luis Torres Segura	1940	PRM	
Constancio Hernández Rizo	1941–1942	PRM	
Flavio Ramírez Álvarez	1943–1944	PRM	
Agustín Camarena Hernández	1945–1946	PRM	
José María Martínez Camarena	1947–1948	PRI	
Adolfo Gazcón López	1949–1951	PRI	
Hilarión Hernández López	1951	PRI	Acting municipal president
Juan de la Cerda Gazcón	01-01-1956–31-12-1958	PRI	
José S. Domínguez Zavala	01-01-1959–31-12-1961	PRI	
Antonio L. Bravo Vázquez	01-01-1962–31-12-1964	PRI	
N/A	01-01-1965–31-12-1967		
Salvador Martínez Patiño	01-01-1968–31-12-1970	PRI	
José Antonio Hernández Orozco	01-01-1971–31-12-1973	PRI	
Liborio Martínez Velázquez	01-01-1974–31-12-1976	PRI	
María Guadalupe Ramírez C.	01-01-1977–31-12-1979	PRI	
Jaime Antonio González T.	01-01-1980–31-12-1982	PRI	
Raúl Álvarez Pérez	1983–1985	PRI	
Alfonso López García	1986	PRI	
José María López Barba	1986–1988	PRI	
Guillermo Hernández Martínez	1988	PRI	
José Guadalupe Tejeda Vázquez	1989–1992	PRI	
Juan Antonio González Hernández	1992–1995	PAN	
José Guadalupe Tejeda Vázquez	1995–1997	PAN	
Eduardo López Camarena	01-01-1998–31-12-2000	PAN	
Jorge Díaz Pérez	01-01-2001–31-12-2003	PRI	
José Luis Magaña Coss y León	01-01-2004–31-12-2006	PAN	
José Guadalupe Tejeda Vázquez	01-01-2007–31-12-2009	PAN	
José Luis Valle Magaña	01-01-2010–30-09-2012	Convergencia	
Omar Hernández Hernández	01-10-2012–30-09-2015	PRI; PVEM	Coalition "Compromise for Jalisco"
Salvador López Hernández	01-10-2015–30-09-2018	PRI; PVEM	
Ana Isabel Bañuelos Ramírez	01-10-2018–07-03-2021	PAN; PRD; MC	Applied for a leave to run for reelection, which she got
Esmeralda Ramírez Magaña	08-03-2021–2021	PAN; PRD; MC	Acting municipal president
Ana Isabel Bañuelos Ramírez	01-10-2021–	MC	Was reelected on 06-06-2021
