= Oscar Saavedra =

Mexican footballer (born 1993)

Personal information
- Full name: Oscar Eduardo Saavedra Flores
- Date of birth: 16 October 1993 (age 33)
- Place of birth: Arandas, Jalisco, Mexico
- Position: Forward

Team information
- Current team: Central Texas Lobos FC
- Number: 10

Senior career*
Years	Team	Apps	(Gls)
2012	Arandas		
2013	CF Estudiantes		
2013–2015	Club León Reserves and Academy		
2016	Club León Premier	25	(5)
2017–18	C.D. Tepatitlán de Morelos	46	(12)
2019–	Central Texas Lobos FC		
- * Club domestic league appearances and goals as of 27 March 2019

Oscar Eduardo Saavedra Flores (born 16 October 1993) is a Mexican professional footballer who plays as a forward for Central Texas Lobos FC.

== Club career ==
=== León ===
Saavedra played with the Club León Academy from 2013 to 2016, and debuted with Club León on September 18, 2013, during the Copa MX tournament in a match against C.D. Guadalajara.

=== Tepatitlán ===
Oscar Saavedra signed with C.D. Tepatitlán de Morelos for the 2017–18 seasons, where the team was proclaimed champion of the 2017–18 season of Serie A after defeating Loros of the University of Colima.

=== U.S. Experience ===
Participated with Corinthians FC of San Antonio on loan 4 games during the 2016 season, and in 2019 joined the Central Texas Lobos FC for the 2019 season of the Gulf Coast Premier League.
