= Juan Pablo Orozco =

Mexican footballer (born 1991)

Personal information
- Full name: Juan Pablo Orozco Lozano
- Date of birth: 24 October 1991 (age 35)
- Place of birth: Arandas, Jalisco, Mexico
- Height: 1.78 m (5 ft 10 in)
- Position: Winger

Team information
- Current team: Zacatepec
- Number: 8

Senior career*
Years	Team	Apps	(Gls)
2011–	Guadalajara	2	(0)
2013–2014	→ Zacatepec 1948 (loan)	26	(1)
2014	→ Tepic (loan)	0	(0)
2015	→ UAT (loan)	8	(1)
2015–	→ Zacatepec (loan)	13	(0)
- * Club domestic league appearances and goals

Juan Pablo Orozco Lozano (born 24 October 1991) is a Mexican professional footballer. He used to play for Zacatepec in the Ascenso MX, but is currently a free agent.

== Club career ==
He began his career at Club Deportivo Guadalajara, making his Liga MX debut on 2 September 2011 against Club Tijuana.
