= Test target =

Spacecraft marking

A test target (for spacecraft) or calibration target is a common feature on interplanetary landing craft such as the Viking Lander and Mars Exploration Rovers.

The target is usually a visible marker or plate on the exterior of the vehicle within sight of the lander's imaging system (usually a CCD camera). The target possesses samples of primary colors and a grey scale. The camera uses this much like a photographer would use a chip chart on Earth; the color samples allow the camera to compensate for white balance and contrast. The target provides a visual reference as well, so that the initial orientation of the camera can be fixed.

On the Mars Exploration Rovers, the target was designed in the shape of a sundial mounted on the rover deck with colored blocks in the corners for color calibration.
