= José Luis Valle Magaña =

Mexican politician (born 1959)

- Born: 26 September 1959 (age 66); Arandas, Jalisco, Mexico
- Occupation: Deputy
- Political party: MC

José Luis Valle Magaña (born 26 September 1959) is a Mexican politician affiliated with the Convergence. He served as Deputy of the LXII Legislature of the Mexican Congress representing Jalisco, and previously served as municipal president of Arandas, Jalisco.
