= Viking program =

Pair of NASA landers and orbiters sent to Mars in 1976

Viking
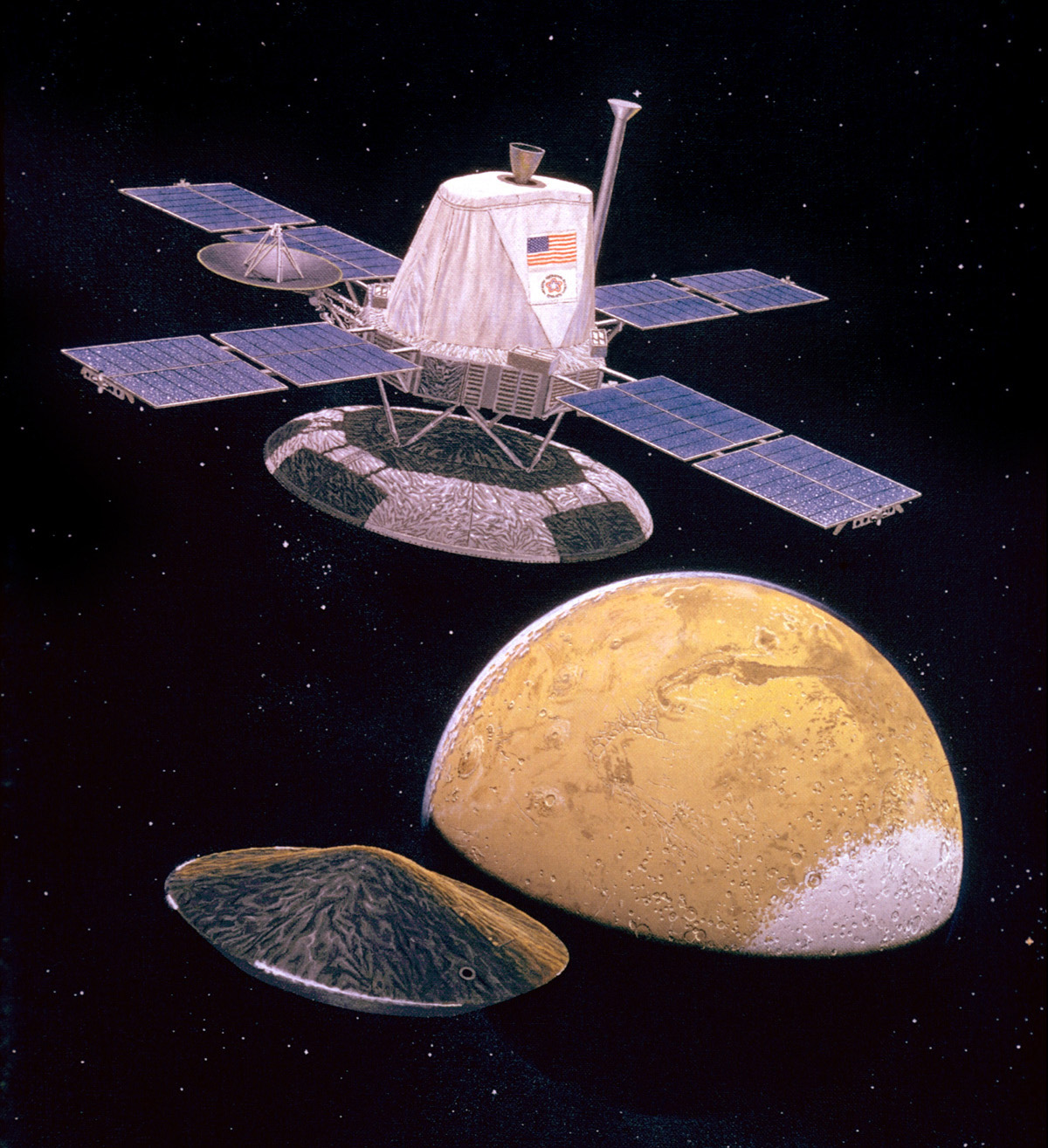
- Artist impression of a Viking orbiter releasing a lander descent capsule
- Manufacturer: Jet Propulsion Laboratory / Martin Marietta
- Country of origin: United States
- Operator: NASA / JPL
- Applications: Mars orbiter/lander

Specifications
- Launch mass: 3,527 kilograms (7,776 lb)
- Power: Orbiters: 620 watts (solar array); Lander: 70 watts (two RTG units)
- Regime: Areocentric
- Design life: Orbiters: 4 years at Mars; Landers: 4–6 years at Mars

Production
- Status: Retired
- Built: 2
- Launched: 2
- Retired: Viking 1 orbiter August 17, 1980; Viking 1 lander July 20, 1976 (landing) to November 13, 1982 Viking 2 orbiter July 25, 1978; Viking 2 lander September 3, 1976 (landing) to April 11, 1980
- Maiden launch: Viking 1 August 20, 1975
- Last launch: Viking 2 September 9, 1975

The Viking program consisted of a pair of identical American space probes, Viking 1 and Viking 2 both launched in 1975, and landed on Mars in 1976. The mission effort began in 1968 and was managed by the NASA Langley Research Center. Each spacecraft was composed of two main parts: an orbiter spacecraft which photographed the surface of Mars from orbit, and a lander which studied the planet from the surface. The orbiters also served as communication relays for the landers once they touched down.

The Viking program grew from NASA's earlier, even more ambitious, Voyager Mars program, which was not related to the successful Voyager deep space probes of the late 1970s. Viking 1 was launched on August 20, 1975, and the second craft, Viking 2, was launched on September 9, 1975, both riding atop Titan IIIE rockets with Centaur upper stages. Viking 1 entered Mars orbit on June 19, 1976, with Viking 2 following on August 7.

After orbiting Mars for more than a month and returning images used for landing site selection, the orbiters and landers detached; the landers then entered the Martian atmosphere and soft-landed at the sites that had been chosen. The Viking 1 lander touched down on the surface of Mars on July 20, 1976, more than two weeks before Viking 2's arrival in orbit. Viking 2 then successfully soft-landed on September 3. The orbiters continued imaging and performing other scientific operations from orbit while the landers deployed instruments on the surface. The program terminated in 1982.

The project cost was roughly US$1 billion at the time of launch, equivalent to about $6 billion in 2025 dollars. The mission was considered successful and formed most of the body of knowledge about Mars through the late 1990s and early 2000s.

== Science objectives ==
- Obtain high-resolution images of the Martian surface
- Characterize the structure and composition of the atmosphere and surface
- Search for evidence of life on Mars

== Viking orbiters ==
The primary objectives of the two Viking orbiters were to transport the landers to Mars, perform reconnaissance to locate and certify landing sites, act as communications relays for the landers, and to perform their own scientific investigations. Each orbiter, based on the earlier Mariner 9 spacecraft, was an octagon approximately 2.5 m (8.2 ft) across. The fully fueled orbiter-lander pair had a mass of 3,527 kg (7,776 lb). After separation and landing, the lander had a mass of about 600 kg (1,300 lb) and the orbiter 900 kg (2,000 lb). The total launch mass was 2,328 kg (5,132 lb), of which 1,445 kg (3,186 lb) were propellant and attitude control gas. The eight faces of the ring-like structure were 0.457 m (18 in) high and were alternately 1.397 and 0.508 m (55 and 20 in) wide. The overall height was 3.29 m (10.8 ft) from the lander attachment points on the bottom to the launch vehicle attachment points on top. There were 16 modular compartments, 3 on each of the 4 long faces and one on each short face. Four solar panel wings extended from the axis of the orbiter, the distance from tip to tip of two oppositely extended solar panels was 9.75 m (32 ft).

=== Propulsion ===
The main propulsion unit was mounted above the orbiter bus. Propulsion was furnished by a bipropellant (monomethylhydrazine and nitrogen tetroxide) liquid-fueled rocket engine which could be gimballed up to 9 degrees. The engine was capable of 1,323 N (297 lbf) thrust, providing a change in velocity of 1,480 m/s (3,300 mph). Attitude control was achieved by 12 small compressed-nitrogen jets.

=== Navigation and communication ===
An acquisition Sun sensor, a cruise Sun sensor, a Canopus star tracker and an inertial reference unit consisting of six gyroscopes allowed three-axis stabilization. Two accelerometers were also on board.

Communications were accomplished through a 20 W S-band (2.3 GHz) transmitter and two 20 W TWTAs. An X band (8.4 GHz) downlink was also added specifically for radio science and to conduct communications experiments. Uplink was via S band (2.1 GHz). A two-axis steerable parabolic dish antenna with a diameter of approximately 1.5 m was attached at one edge of the orbiter base, and a fixed low-gain antenna extended from the top of the bus. Two tape recorders were each capable of storing 1280 megabits. A 381-MHz relay radio was also available.

=== Power ===
The power to the two orbiter craft was provided by eight 1.57 m × 1.23 m (62 in × 48 in) solar panels, two on each wing. The solar panels comprised a total of 34,800 solar cells and produced 620 W of power at Mars. Power was also stored in two nickel-cadmium 30-A·h batteries.

The combined area of the four panels was 15 square meters (160 square feet), and they provided both regulated and unregulated direct current power; unregulated power was provided to the radio transmitter and the lander.

Two 30-amp·hour, nickel-cadmium, rechargeable batteries provided power when the spacecraft was not facing the Sun, during launch, while performing correction maneuvers and also during Mars occultation.

=== Main findings ===
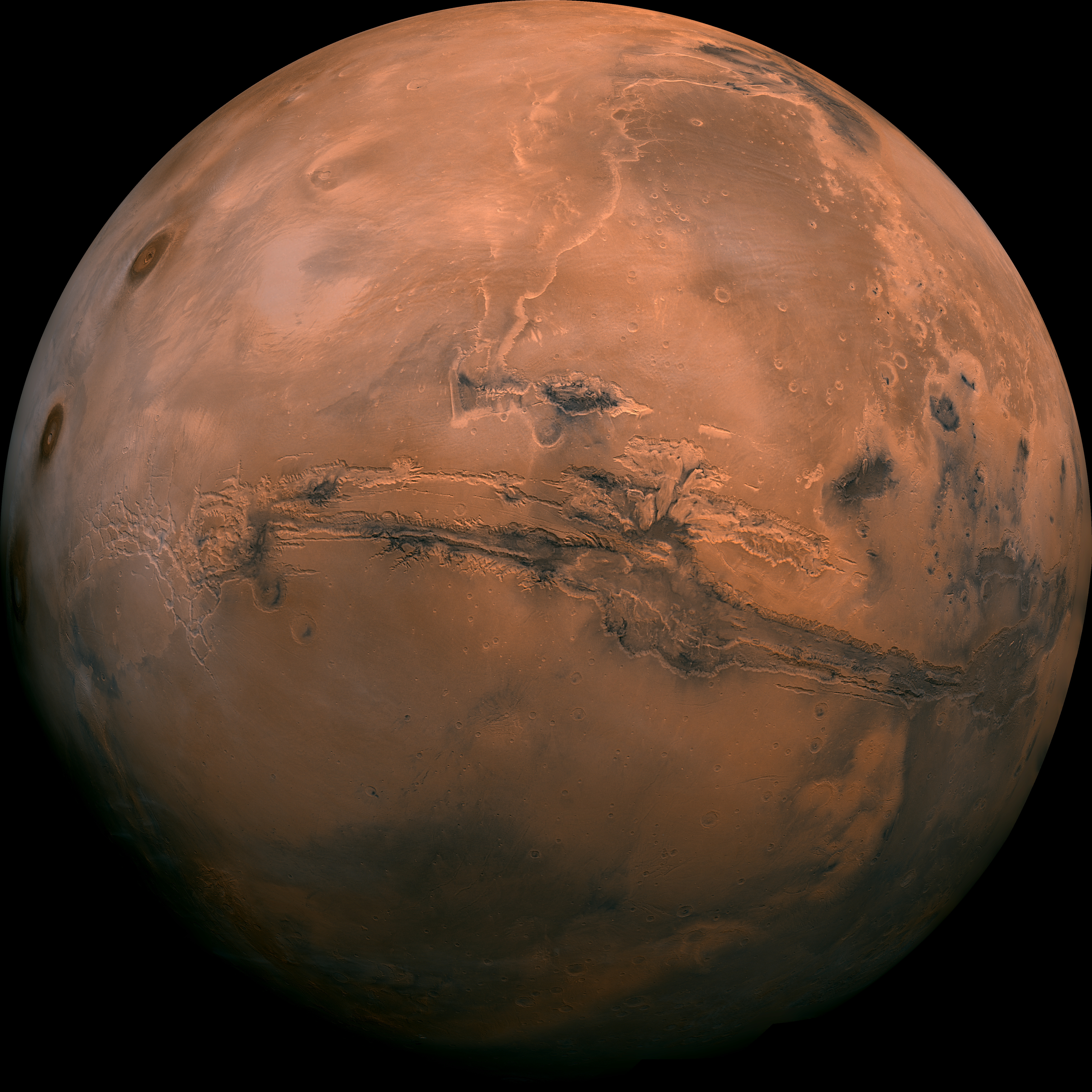
Mars image mosaic from the Viking 1 orbiter

By discovering many geological forms that are typically formed from large amounts of water, the images from the orbiters caused a revolution in our ideas about water on Mars. Huge river valleys were found in many areas. They showed that floods of water broke through dams, carved deep valleys, eroded grooves into bedrock, and travelled thousands of kilometers. Large areas in the southern hemisphere contained branched stream networks, suggesting that rain once fell. The flanks of some volcanoes are believed to have been exposed to rainfall because they resemble those caused on Hawaiian volcanoes. Many craters look as if the impactor fell into mud. When they were formed, ice in the soil may have melted, turned the ground into mud, then flowed across the surface. Normally, material from an impact goes up, then down. It does not flow across the surface, going around obstacles, as it does on some Martian craters. Regions, called "Chaotic Terrain," seemed to have quickly lost great volumes of water, causing large channels to be formed. The amount of water involved was estimated to ten thousand times the flow of the Mississippi River. Underground volcanism may have melted frozen ice; the water then flowed away and the ground collapsed to leave chaotic terrain.

Viking mosaics
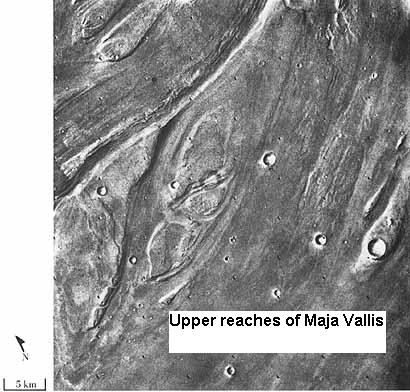
Streamlined islands show that large floods occurred on Mars.
(Lunae Palus quadrangle)

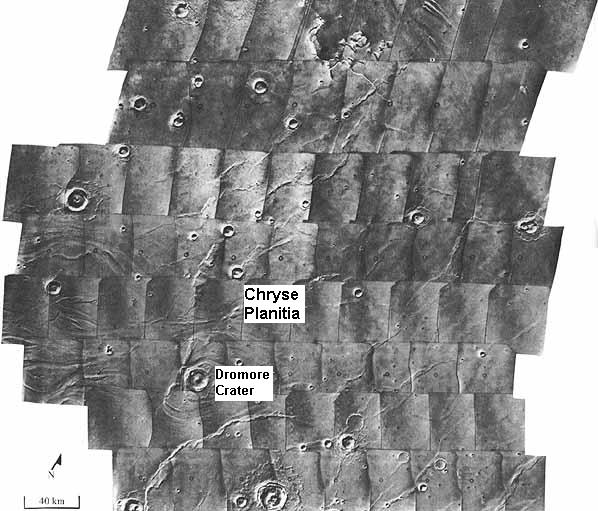
Scour patterns were produced by flowing water. Dromore crater is at bottom.
(Lunae Palus quadrangle)

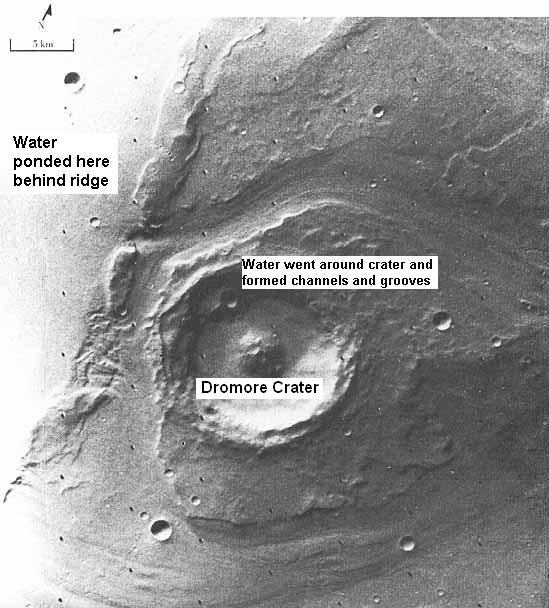
Large floods of water likely eroded the channels around Dromore crater.
(Lunae Palus quadrangle)

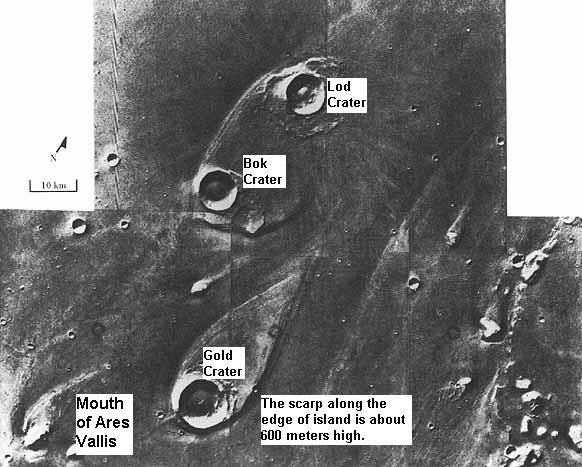
Tear-drop shaped islands carved by flood waters from Ares Vallis.
(Oxia Palus quadrangle)

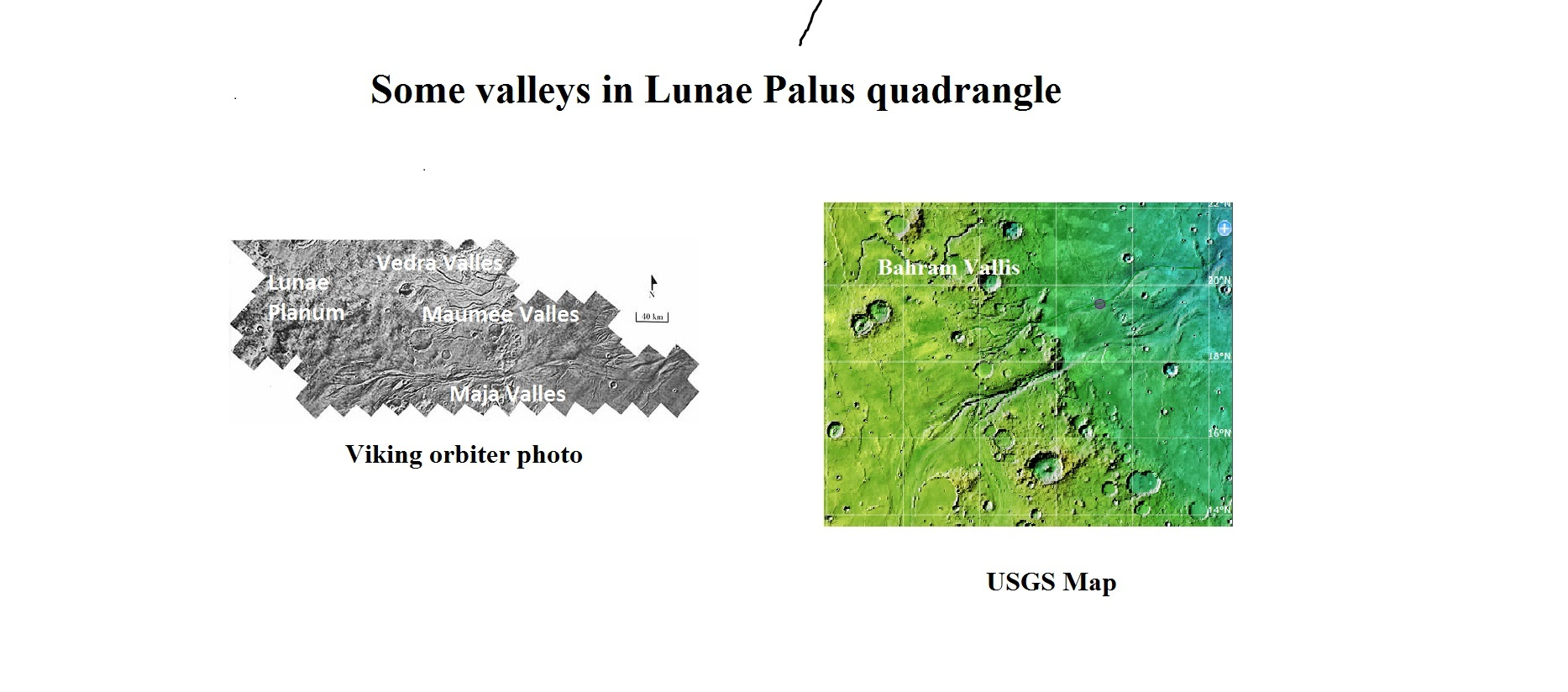
Image of three valleys: Vedra Valles, Maumee Valles, and Maja Valles.
(Lunae Palus quadrangle)

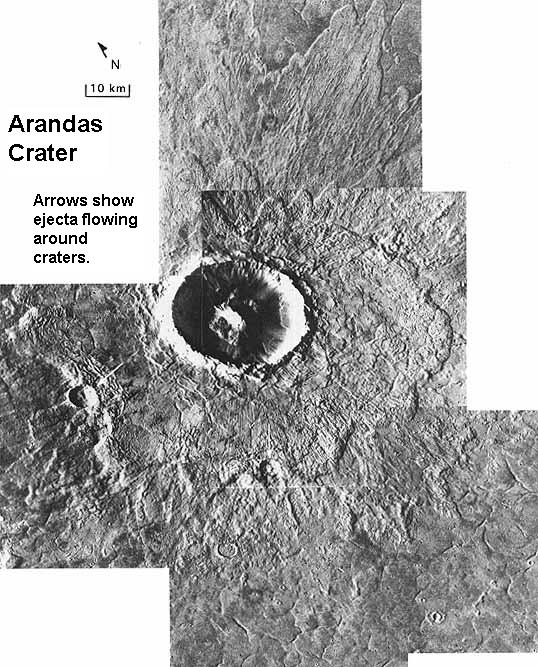
Arandas crater may be on top of large quantities of water ice, which melted when the impact occurred, producing a mud-like ejecta.
(Mare Acidalium quadrangle)

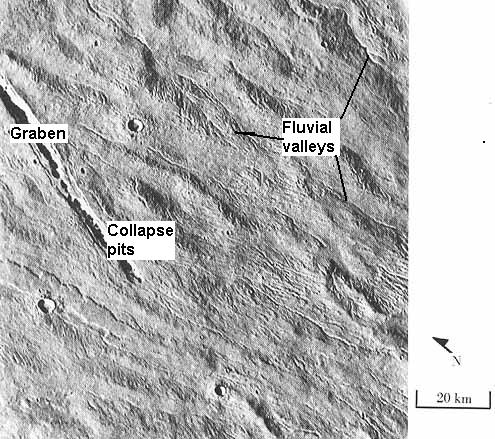
Channels running through Alba Mons.
(Arcadia quadrangle)

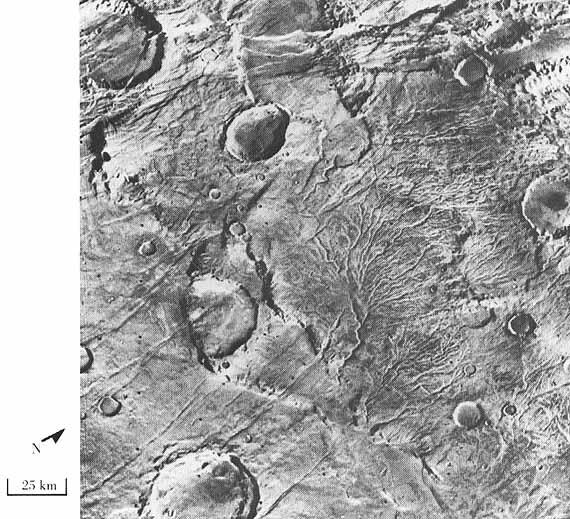
Branched channels in Thaumasia quadrangle provide possible evidence of past rain on Mars.

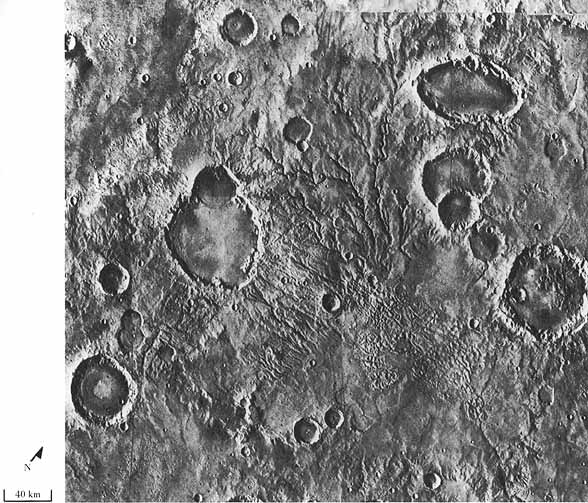
These branched channels provide possible evidence of past rain on Mars. (Margaritifer Sinus quadrangle)

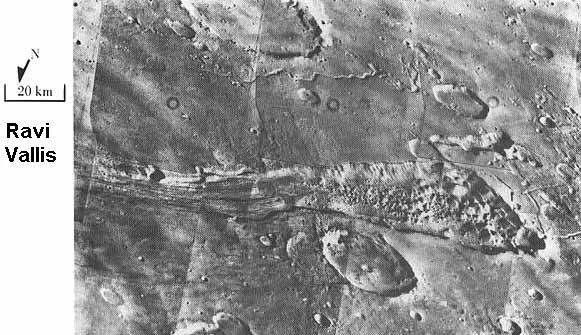
Ravi Vallis was possibly formed from extreme flooding.
(Margaritifer Sinus quadrangle)

== Viking landers ==
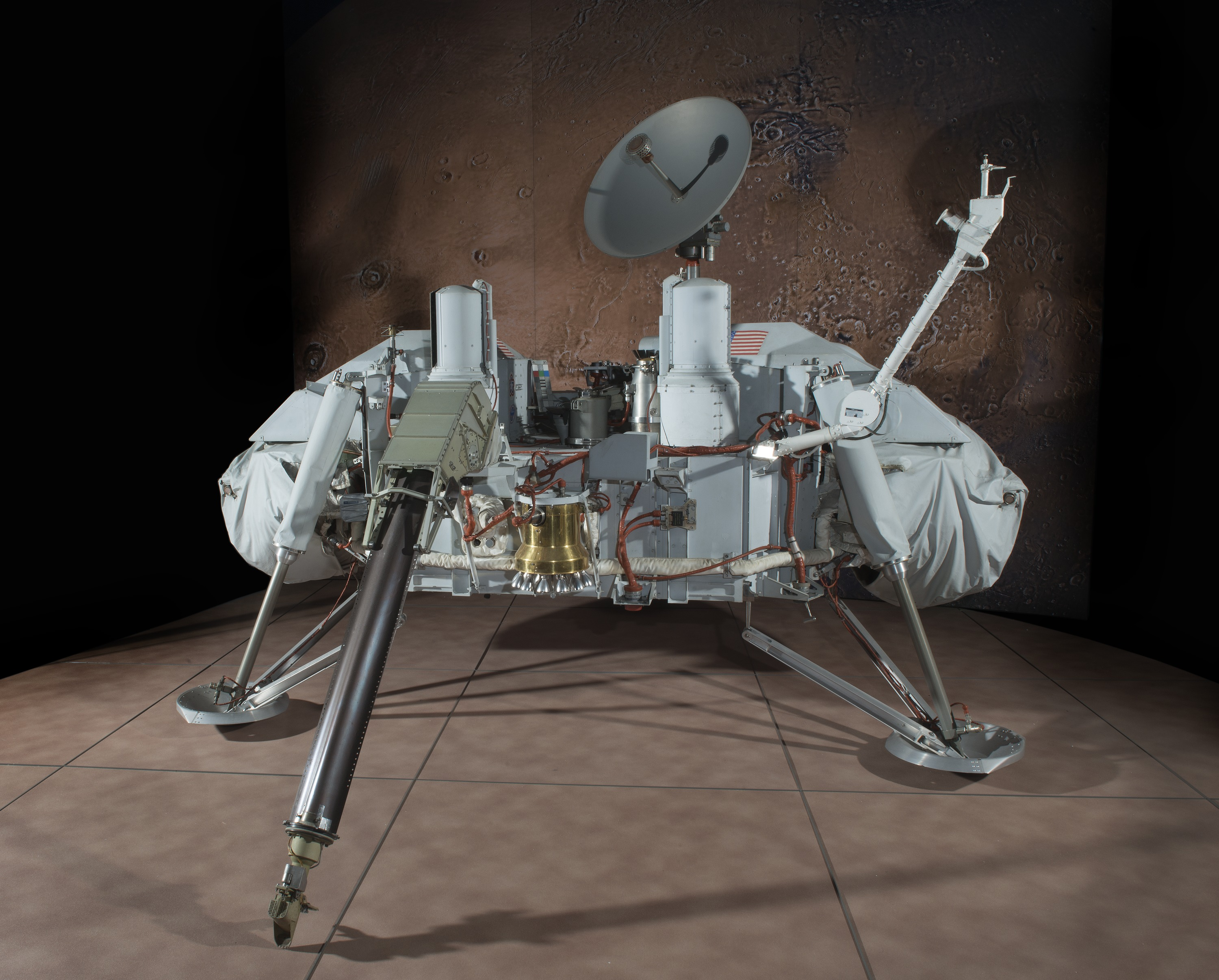
Proof test article of the Viking lander

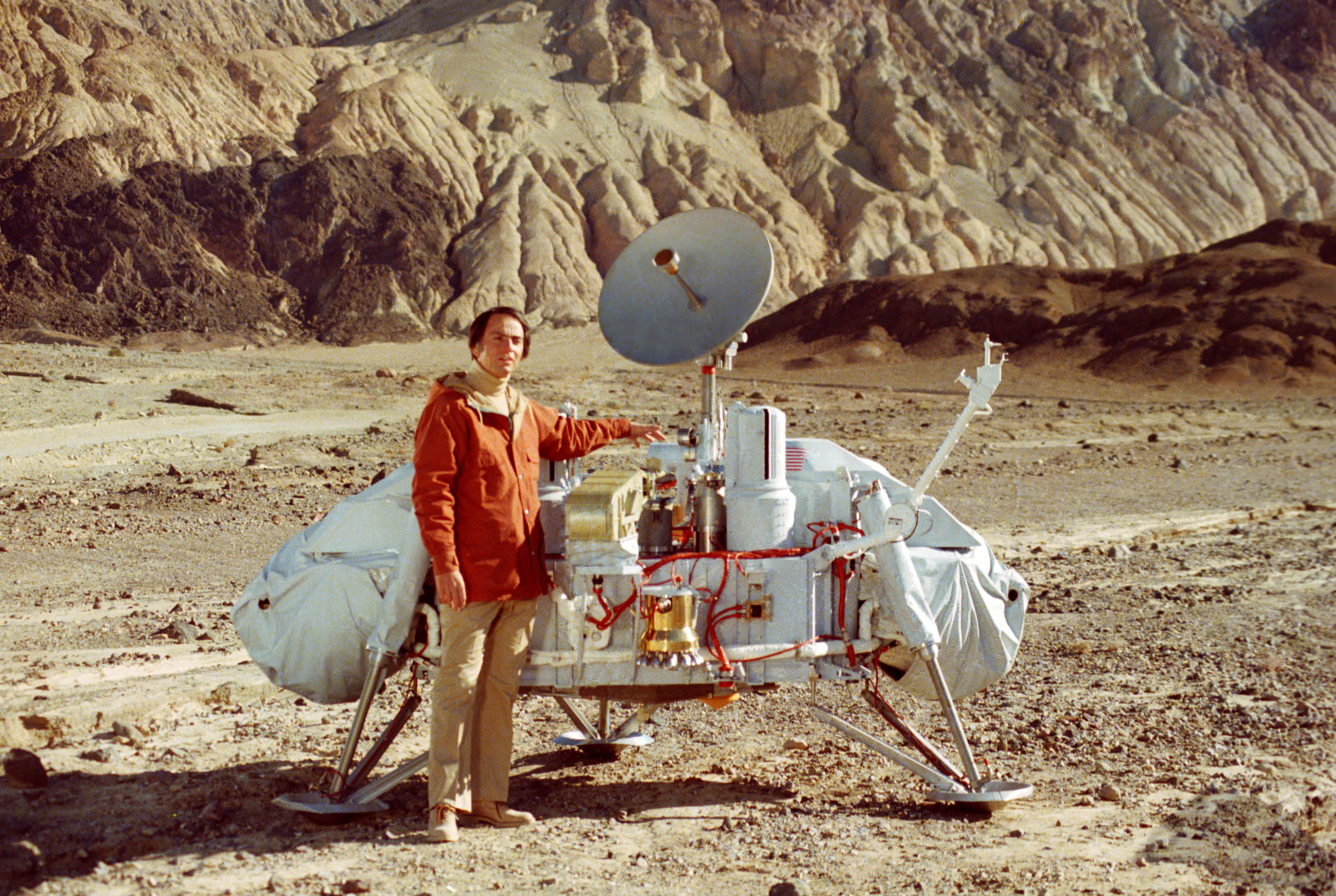
Astronomer Carl Sagan stands next to a model of a Viking lander to provide scale

Each lander comprised a six-sided aluminium base with alternate 1.09 and 0.56 m (43 and 22 in) long sides, supported on three extended legs attached to the shorter sides. The leg footpads formed the vertices of an equilateral triangle with 2.21 m (7.3 ft) sides when viewed from above, with the long sides of the base forming a straight line with the two adjoining footpads. Instrumentation was attached inside and on top of the base, elevated above the surface by the extended legs.

Each lander was enclosed in an aeroshell heat shield designed to slow the lander down during the entry phase. To prevent contamination of Mars by Earth organisms, each lander, upon assembly and enclosure within the aeroshell, was enclosed in a pressurized "bioshield" and then sterilized at a temperature of 111 °C (232 °F) for 40 hours. For thermal reasons, the cap of the bioshield was jettisoned after the Centaur upper stage powered the Viking orbiter/lander combination out of Earth orbit.

Astronomer Carl Sagan helped to choose landing sites for both Viking probes.

=== Entry, Descent and Landing (EDL) ===
Each lander arrived at Mars attached to the orbiter. The assembly orbited Mars many times before the lander was released and separated from the orbiter for descent to the surface. Descent comprised four distinct phases, starting with a deorbit burn. The lander then experienced atmospheric entry with peak heating occurring a few seconds after the start of frictional heating with the Martian atmosphere. At an altitude of about 6 kilometers (3.7 miles) and traveling at a velocity of 900 kilometers per hour (600 mph), the parachute deployed, the aeroshell released and the lander's legs unfolded. At an altitude of about 1.5 kilometers (5,000 feet), the lander activated its three retro-engines and was released from the parachute. The lander then immediately used retrorockets to slow and control its descent, with a soft landing on the surface of Mars.

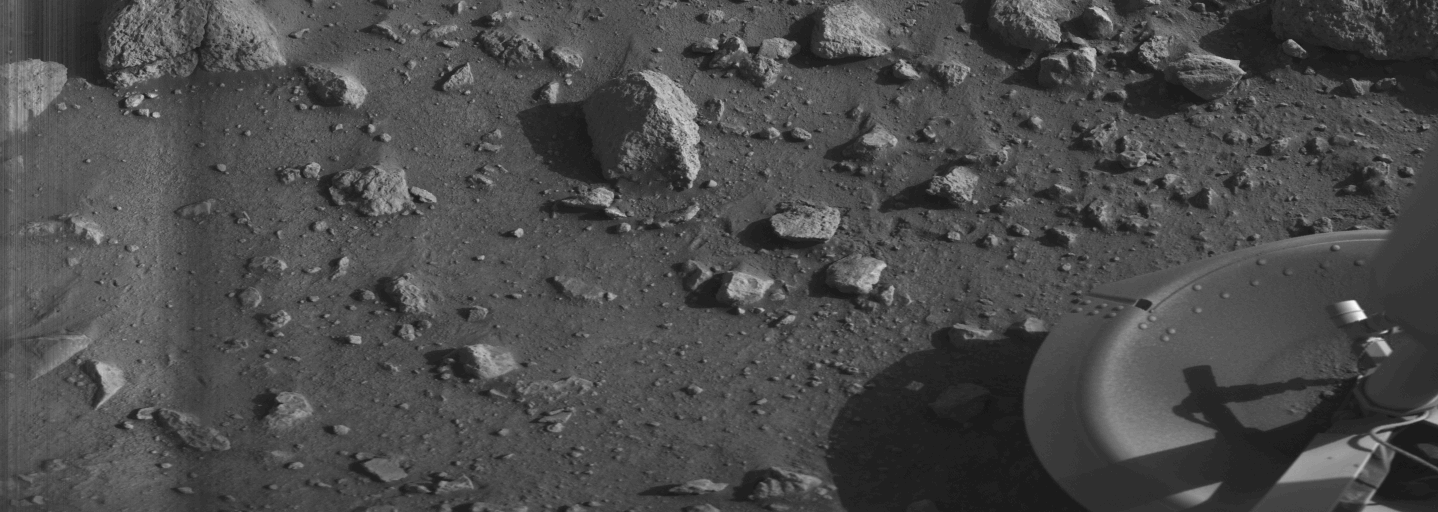
First "clear" image ever transmitted from the surface of Mars – shows rocks near the Viking 1 lander (July 20, 1976).

At landing (after using rocket propellant) the landers had a mass of about 600 kg.

=== Propulsion ===
Propulsion for deorbit was provided by the monopropellant hydrazine (N_{2}H_{4}), through a rocket with 12 nozzles arranged in four clusters of three that provided 32 newtons (7.2 lb_{f}) thrust, translating to a change in velocity of 180 m/s (590 ft/s). These nozzles also acted as the control thrusters for translation and rotation of the lander.

Terminal descent (after use of a parachute) and landing used three (one affixed on each long side of the base, separated by 120 degrees) monopropellant hydrazine engines. The engines had 18 nozzles to disperse the exhaust and minimize effects on the ground, and were throttleable from 276 to 2,667 newtons (62 to 600 lb_{f}). The hydrazine was purified in order to prevent contamination of the Martian surface with Earth microbes. The lander carried 85 kg (187 lb) of propellant at launch, contained in two spherical titanium tanks mounted on opposite sides of the lander beneath the RTG windscreens, giving a total launch mass of 657 kg (1,448 lb). Control was achieved through the use of an inertial reference unit, four gyros, a radar altimeter, a terminal descent and landing radar, and the control thrusters.

=== Power ===
Power was provided by two radioisotope thermoelectric generator (RTG) units containing plutonium-238 affixed to opposite sides of the lander base and covered by wind screens. Each Viking RTG was 28 cm (11 in) tall, 58 cm (23 in) in diameter, had a mass of 13.6 kg (30 lb) and provided 30 watts of continuous power at 4.4 volts. Four wet cell sealed nickel-cadmium 8 Ah (28,800 coulombs), 28 volt rechargeable batteries were also on board to handle peak power loads.

=== Payload ===
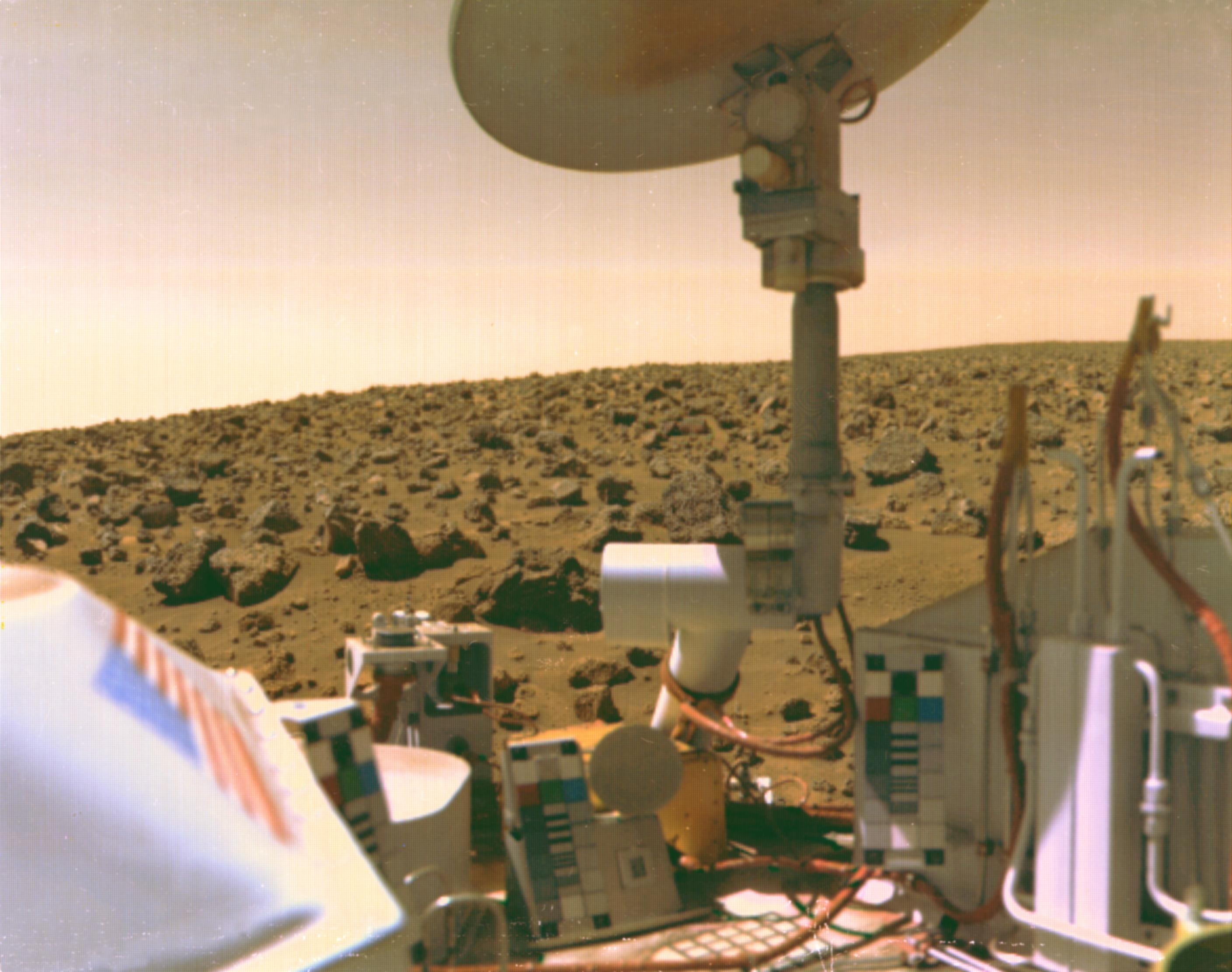
Image from Mars taken by the Viking 2 lander

==== Communications ====
Communications were accomplished through a 20-watt S-band transmitter using two traveling-wave tubes. A two-axis steerable high-gain parabolic antenna was mounted on a boom near one edge of the lander base. An omnidirectional low-gain S-band antenna also extended from the base. Both these antennae allowed for communication directly with the Earth, permitting Viking 1 to continue to work long after both orbiters had failed. A UHF (381 MHz) antenna provided a one-way relay to the orbiter using a 30 watt relay radio. Data storage was on a 40-Mbit tape recorder, and the lander computer had a 6000-word memory for command instructions.

==== Instruments ====
The lander carried instruments to achieve the primary scientific objectives of the lander mission: to study the biology, chemical composition (organic and inorganic), meteorology, seismology, magnetic properties, appearance, and physical properties of the Martian surface and atmosphere. Two 360-degree cylindrical scan cameras were mounted near one long side of the base. From the center of this side extended the sampler arm, with a collector head, temperature sensor, and magnet on the end. A meteorology boom, holding temperature, wind direction, and wind velocity sensors extended out and up from the top of one of the lander legs. A seismometer, magnet and camera test targets, and magnifying mirror are mounted opposite the cameras, near the high-gain antenna. An interior environmentally controlled compartment held the biology experiment and the gas chromatograph mass spectrometer. The X-ray fluorescence spectrometer was also mounted within the structure. A pressure sensor was attached under the lander body. The scientific payload had a total mass of approximately 91 kg (201 lb).

=== Biological experiments ===
The Viking landers conducted biological experiments designed to detect life in the Martian soil (if it existed) with experiments designed by three separate teams, under the direction of chief scientist Gerald Soffen of NASA. One experiment turned positive for the detection of metabolism (current life), but based on the results of the other two experiments that failed to reveal any organic molecules in the soil, most scientists became convinced that the positive results were likely caused by non-biological chemical reactions from highly oxidizing soil conditions.

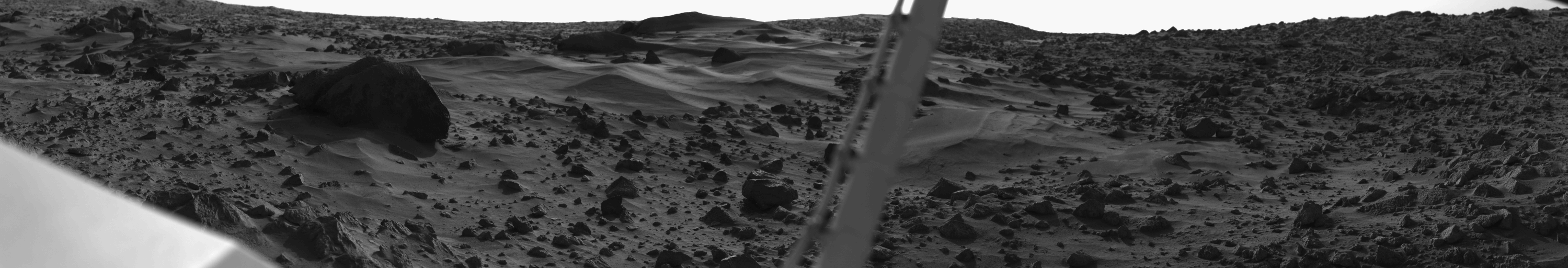
Dust dunes and a large boulder taken by the Viking 1 lander

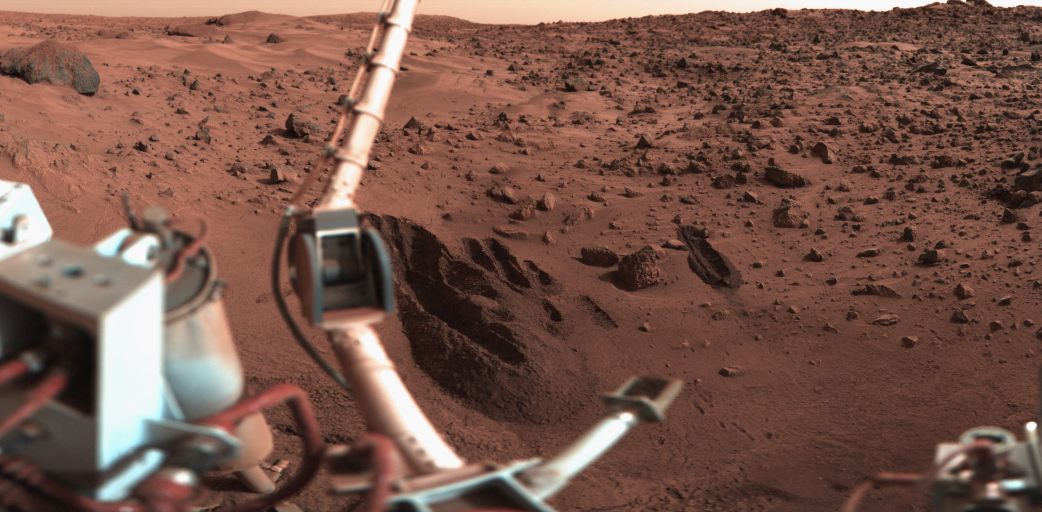
Trenches dug by the soil sampler of the Viking 1 lander

Although there was a pronouncement by NASA during the mission saying that the Viking lander results did not demonstrate conclusive biosignatures in soils at the two landing sites, the test results and their limitations are still under assessment. The validity of the positive 'Labeled Release' (LR) results hinged entirely on the absence of an oxidative agent in the Martian soil, but one was later discovered by the Phoenix lander in the form of perchlorate salts. It has been proposed that organic compounds could have been present in the soil analyzed by both Viking 1 and Viking 2, but remained unnoticed due to the presence of perchlorate, as detected by Phoenix in 2008. Researchers found that perchlorate will destroy organics when heated and will produce chloromethane and dichloromethane, the identical chlorine compounds discovered by both Viking landers when they performed the same tests on Mars.

The question of microbial life on Mars remains unresolved. Nonetheless, on April 12, 2012, an international team of scientists reported studies, based on mathematical speculation through complexity analysis of the Labeled Release experiments of the 1976 Viking Mission, that may suggest the detection of "extant microbial life on Mars." In addition, new findings from re-examination of the Gas Chromatograph Mass Spectrometer (GCMS) results were published in 2018.

=== Camera/imaging system ===
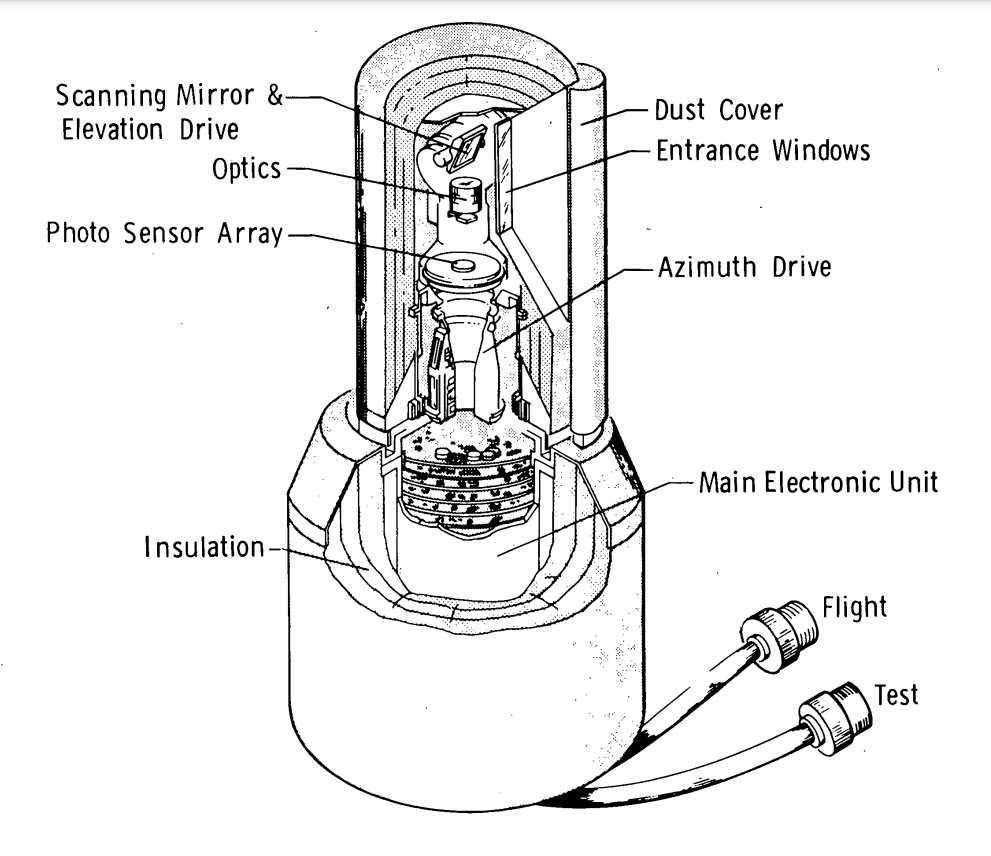
Viking Lander Camera

The leader of the imaging team was Thomas A. Mutch, a geologist at Brown University in Providence, Rhode Island. The camera uses a movable mirror to illuminate 12 photodiodes. Each of the 12 silicon diodes are designed to be sensitive to different frequencies of light.

Several broad band diodes (designated BB1, BB2, BB3, and BB4) are placed to focus accurately at distances between six and 43 feet away from the lander. A low resolution broad band diode was named SURVEY. There are also three narrow band low resolution diodes (named BLUE, GREEN and RED) for obtaining color images, and another three (IR1, IR2, and IR3) for infrared imagery.

The cameras scanned at a rate of five vertical scan lines per second, each composed of 512 pixels. The 300 degree panorama images were composed of 9150 lines. The cameras' scan was slow enough that in a crew shot taken during development of the imaging system several members show up several times in the shot as they moved themselves as the camera scanned.

=== Mass Breakdown of Viking Landers ===
Item	Mass, kg (lb)
Structures and Mechanisms	132 kg (291 lb)
Propulsion	56 kg (123 lb)
Pyro and Cabling	43 kg (95 lb)
Thermal Control	36 kg (79 lb)
Guidance and Control	79 kg (174 lb)
Power	103 kg (227 lb)
Communications / Telemetry	57 kg (126 lb)
Science Instruments	91 kg (201 lb)
=Total Dry Mass	595 kg (1,312 lb)
+Landing Propellant (incl. ~15 kg (33 lb) residuals)	84 kg (185 lb)
+Decelerator (incl.lander deorbit propellant)	118 kg (260 lb)
+Aeroshell	269 kg (593 lb)
+Bioshield	74 kg (163 lb)
+Cap	54 kg (119 lb)
=Total Launch Mass (Lander+Flight Capsule)	1,194 kg (2,632 lb)

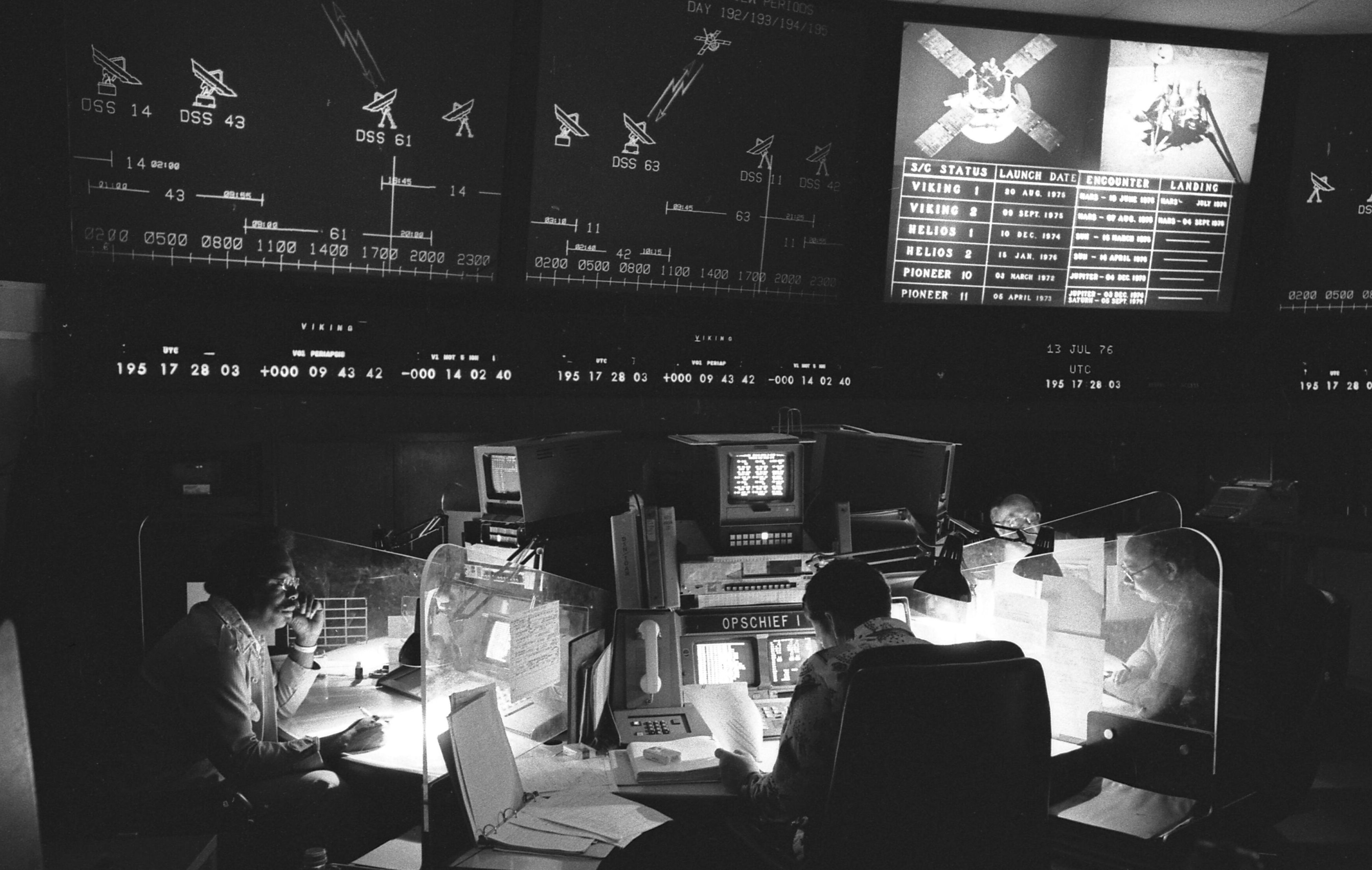
Viking control room at the Jet Propulsion Laboratory, days before the landing of Viking 1

== Control systems ==
The Viking landers used a Guidance, Control and Sequencing Computer (GCSC) consisting of two Honeywell HDC 402 24-bit computers with 18K of plated-wire memory, while the Viking orbiters used a Command Computer Subsystem (CCS) using two custom-designed 18-bit serial processors.

== Financial cost of the Viking program ==
The two orbiters cost US$217 million at the time, which is about $1 billion in 2025 dollars. The most expensive single part of the program was the lander's life-detection unit, which cost about $60 million then or $400 million in 2025 dollars. Development of the Viking lander design cost $357 million. This was decades before NASA's "faster, better, cheaper" approach, and Viking needed to pioneer unprecedented technologies under national pressure brought on by the Cold War and the aftermath of the Space Race, all under the prospect of possibly discovering extraterrestrial life for the first time. The experiments had to adhere to a special 1971 directive that mandated that no single failure shall stop the return of more than one experiment—a difficult and expensive task for a device with over 40,000 parts.

The Viking camera system cost $27.3 million to develop, or about $200 million in 2025 dollars. When the Imaging system design was completed, it was difficult to find anyone who could manufacture its advanced design. The program managers were later praised for fending off pressure to go with a simpler, less advanced imaging system, especially when the views rolled in. The program did however save some money by cutting out a third lander and reducing the number of experiments on the lander.

Overall NASA says that $1 billion in 1970s dollars was spent on the program, which when inflation-adjusted to 2025 dollars is about $6 billion.

== Mission end ==
The craft all eventually failed, one by one, as follows:
Craft	Arrival date	Shut-off date	Operational lifetime	Cause of failure
Viking 2 orbiter	August 7, 1976	July 25, 1978	1 year, 11 months, 18 days	Shut down after fuel leak in propulsion system.
Viking 2 lander	September 3, 1976	April 11, 1980	3 years, 7 months, 8 days	Shut down after battery failure.
Viking 1 orbiter	June 19, 1976	August 17, 1980	4 years, 1-month, 19 days	Shut down after depletion of attitude control fuel.
Viking 1 lander	July 20, 1976	November 13, 1982	6 years, 3 months, 22 days	Shut down after human error during software update caused the lander's antenna to go down, terminating power and communication.

The Viking program ended on May 21, 1983. To prevent an imminent impact with Mars, the orbit of Viking 1 orbiter was raised on August 7, 1980, before it was shut down 10 days later. Impact and potential contamination on the planet's surface is possible from 2019 onwards.

The Viking 1 lander was found to be about 6 kilometers from its planned landing site by the Mars Reconnaissance Orbiter in December 2006.

== Message artifact ==
Each 'Viking' lander carried a tiny dot of microfilm containing the names of several thousand people who had worked on the mission. Several earlier and later space probes had carried message artifacts, such as the Pioneer plaque and the Voyager Golden Record. Later probes also carried memorials or lists of names, such as the Perseverance rover which recognizes the almost 11 million people who signed up to include their names on the mission.

== See also ==
- Exploration of Mars
- Life on Mars – Assessments of possible life on Mars
- List of missions to Mars
- Mars Science Laboratory – Robotic mission that deployed the Curiosity rover to Mars in 2012
- Mars Pathfinder – Mission including first robotic rover to operate on Mars (1997)
- Norman L. Crabill – NASA engineer (1926–2024)
