= Arandas (crater) =

Crater on Mars

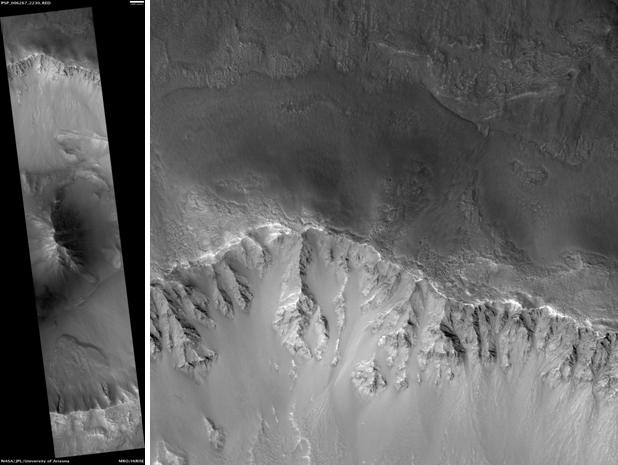
- Arandas crater, as seen by HiRISE. Click on image for a better view of North and South Walls, as well as central hills. Scale bar is 1000 meters long.
- Planet: Mars
- Coordinates: 42.77°N 15.17°W
- Quadrangle: Mare Acidalium
- Diameter: 24.76 km (15.39 mi)
- Eponym: The town of Arandas in Mexico

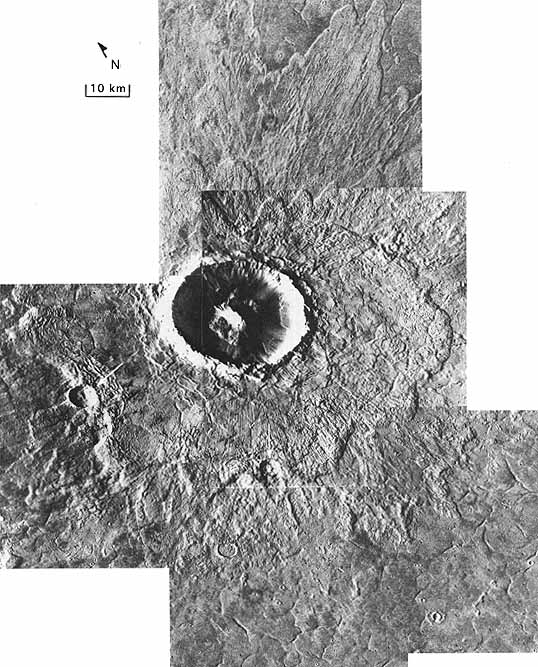
Viking orbiter mosaic of Arandas crater

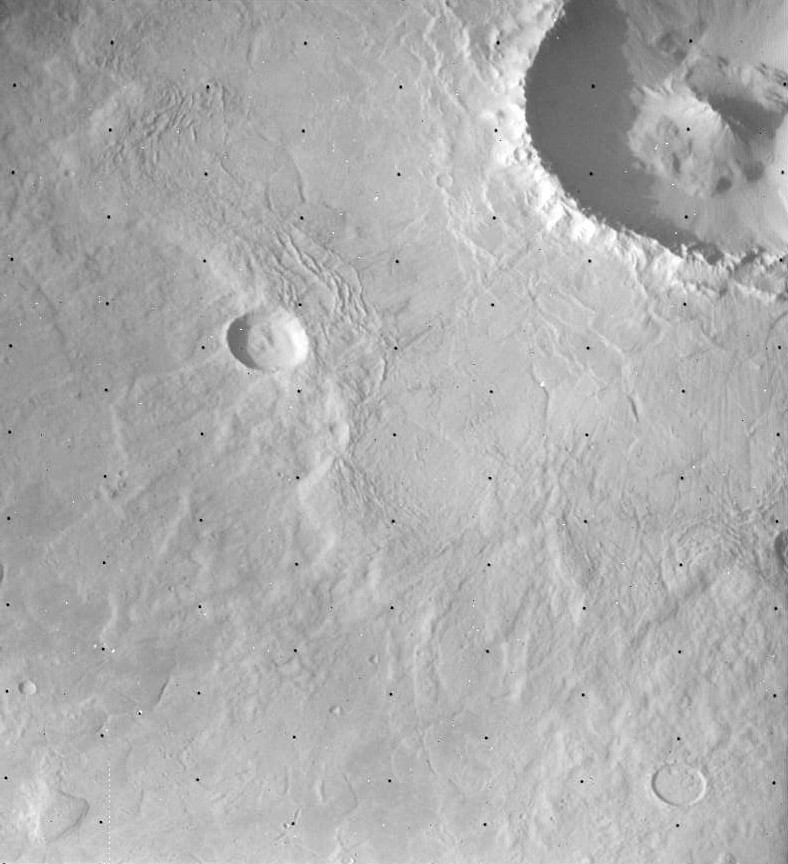
Detail of the ejecta of Arandas crater

Arandas is a crater in the Mare Acidalium quadrangle of Mars, located 42.77° North and 15.17° West. It is 24.76 km (15.39 mi) in diameter and is named after the town of Arandas in Mexico.

Gullies are visible in Arandas. On the basis of their form, aspects, positions, and location amongst an apparent interaction with features thought to be rich in water ice, many researchers believed that the processes carving the gullies involve liquid water. However, this remains a topic of active research. As soon as gullies were discovered, researchers began to image many gullies over and over, looking for possible changes. By 2006, some changes were found. Later, with further analysis it was determined that the changes could have occurred by dry granular flows rather than being driven by flowing water. With continued observations many more changes were found in Gasa Crater and others. As further observations have been made, still more changes have been noted; since the changes occur in the winter and spring, experts tend to believe that gullies were formed from dry ice. Before-and-after images demonstrated the timing of this activity coincided with seasonal carbon-dioxide frost and temperatures that would not have allowed for liquid water. When dry ice frost changes to a gas, it may lubricate dry material to flow, especially on steep slopes.

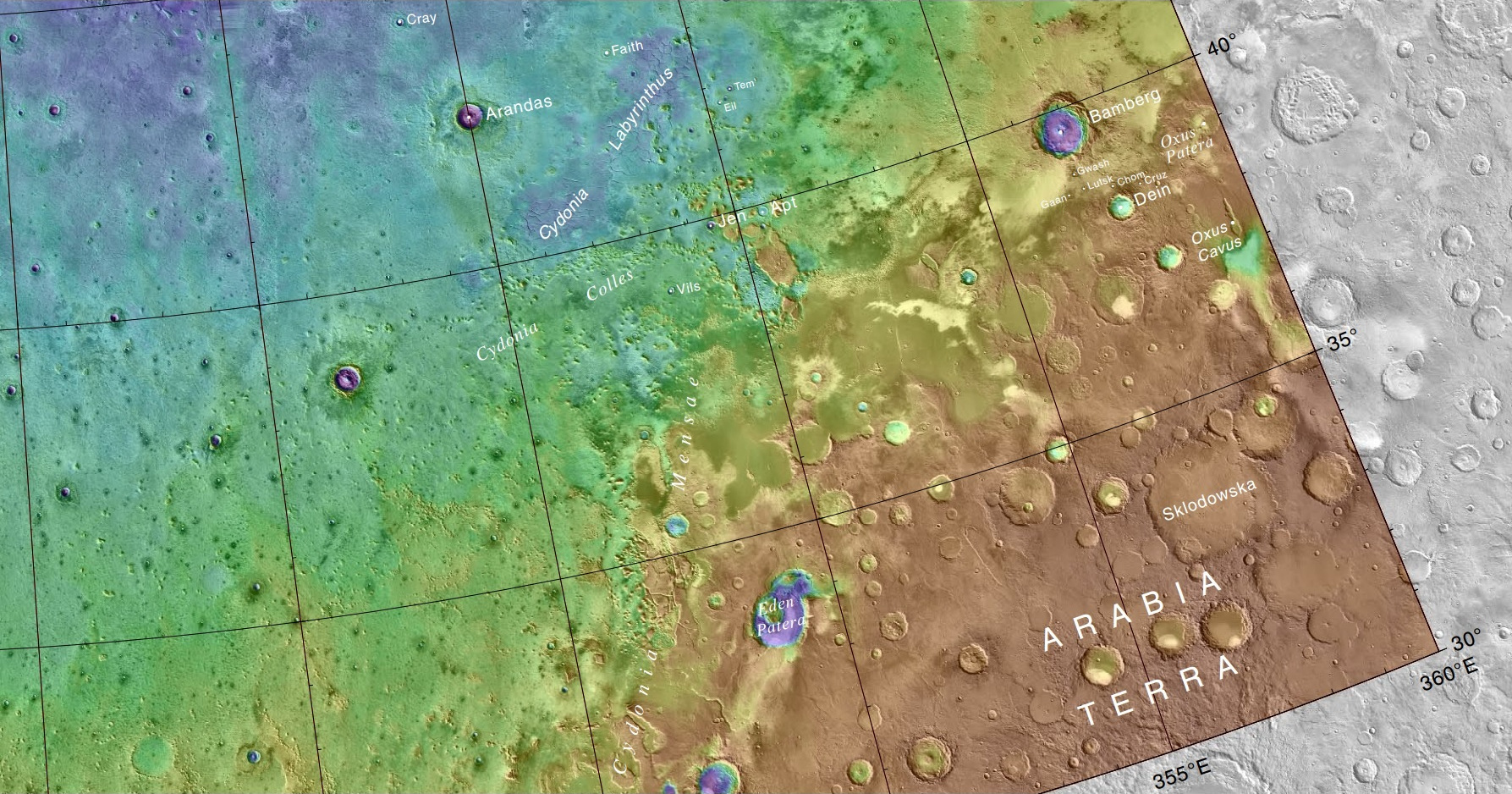
MOLA map showing Arandas crater and other nearby craters. Color indicates elevation.

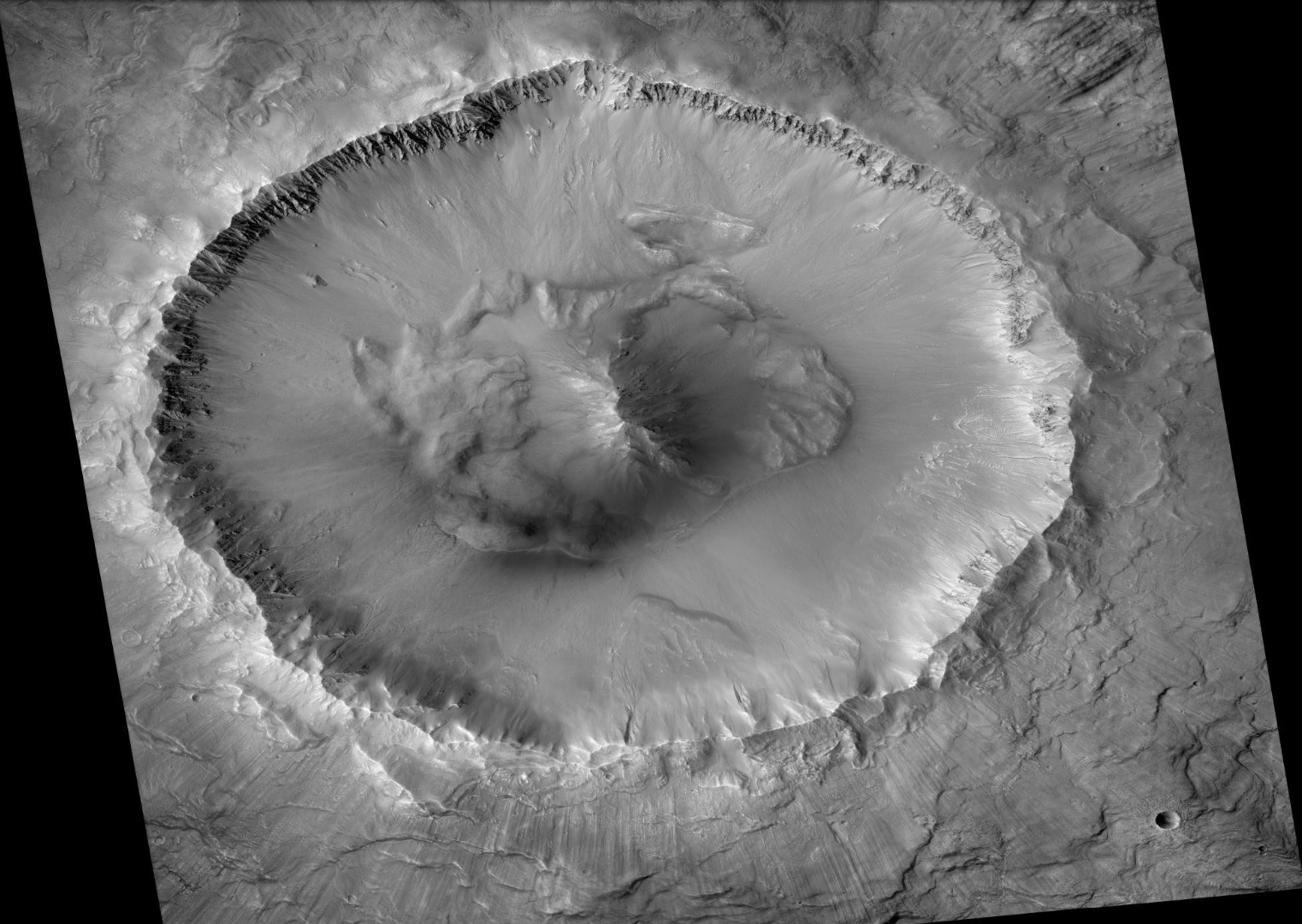
Arandas crater, as seen by CTX camera (on MRO).

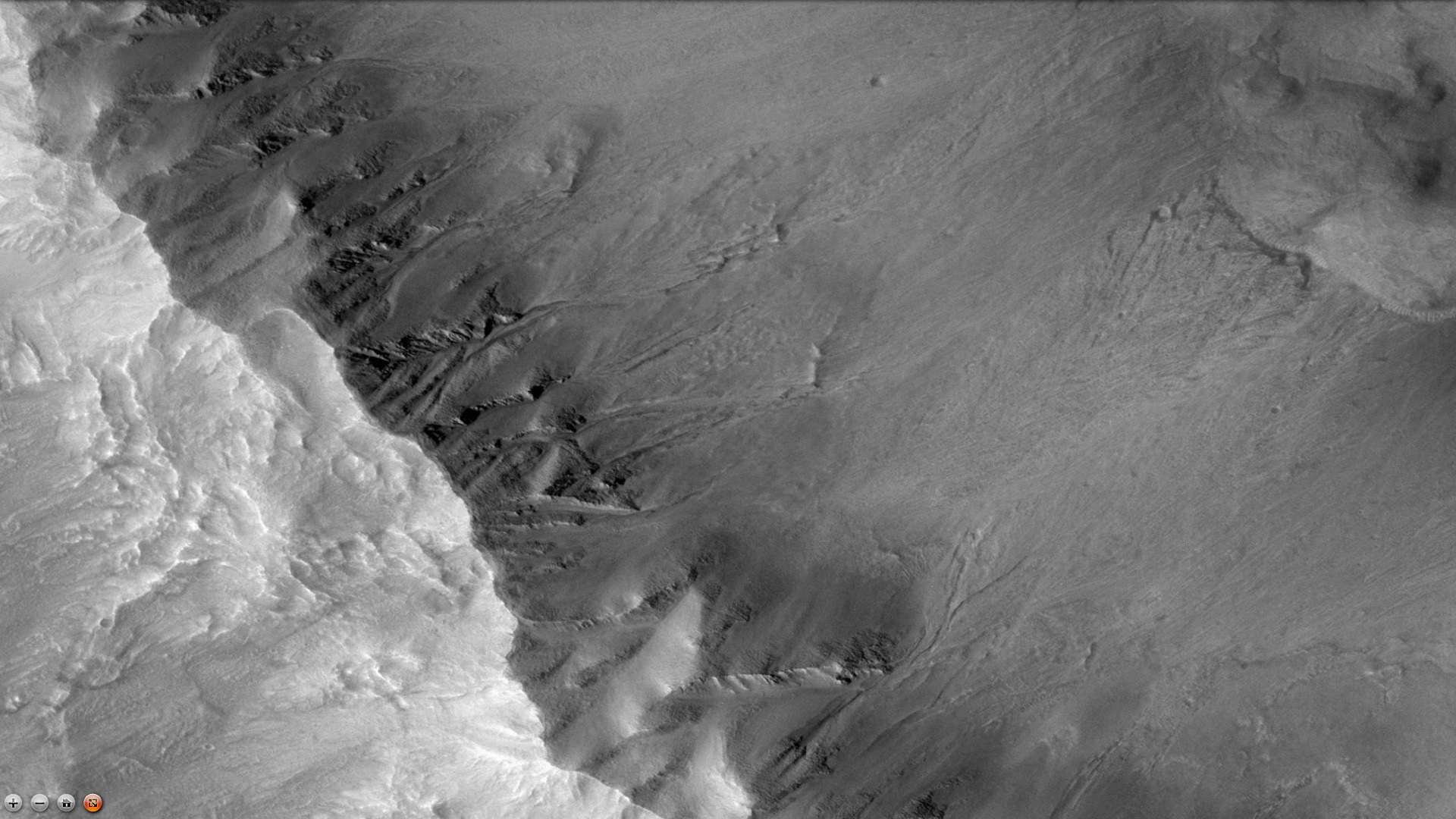
Gullies in Arandas, as seen by CTX camera. Note: this is an enlargement of the previous photo.

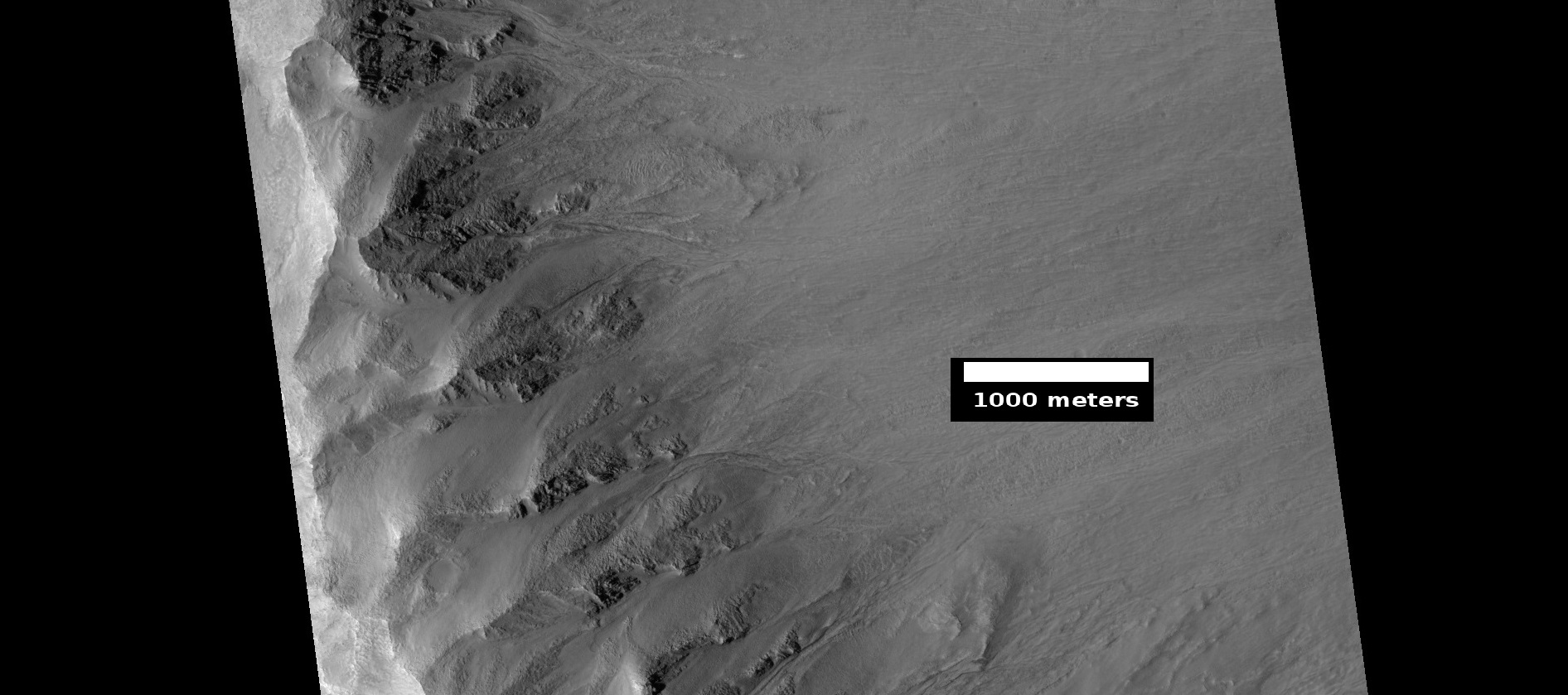
Gullies in Arandas, as seen by HiRISE under HiWish program.

Impact craters generally have a rim with ejecta around them, in contrast volcanic craters usually do not have a rim or ejecta deposits. As craters get larger (greater than 10 km (6.2 mi) in diameter) they usually have a central peak. The peak is caused by a rebound of the crater floor following the impact. Sometimes craters expose layers that were buried. Rocks from deep underground are tossed onto the surface. Hence, craters can expose what lies deep under the surface.

== See also ==
- Impact event
- List of craters on Mars
- Mare Acidalium quadrangle
- Martian Gullies
- Ore resources on Mars
- Planetary nomenclature
- Water on Mars
