= InSight =

NASA Mars lander (2018–2022)

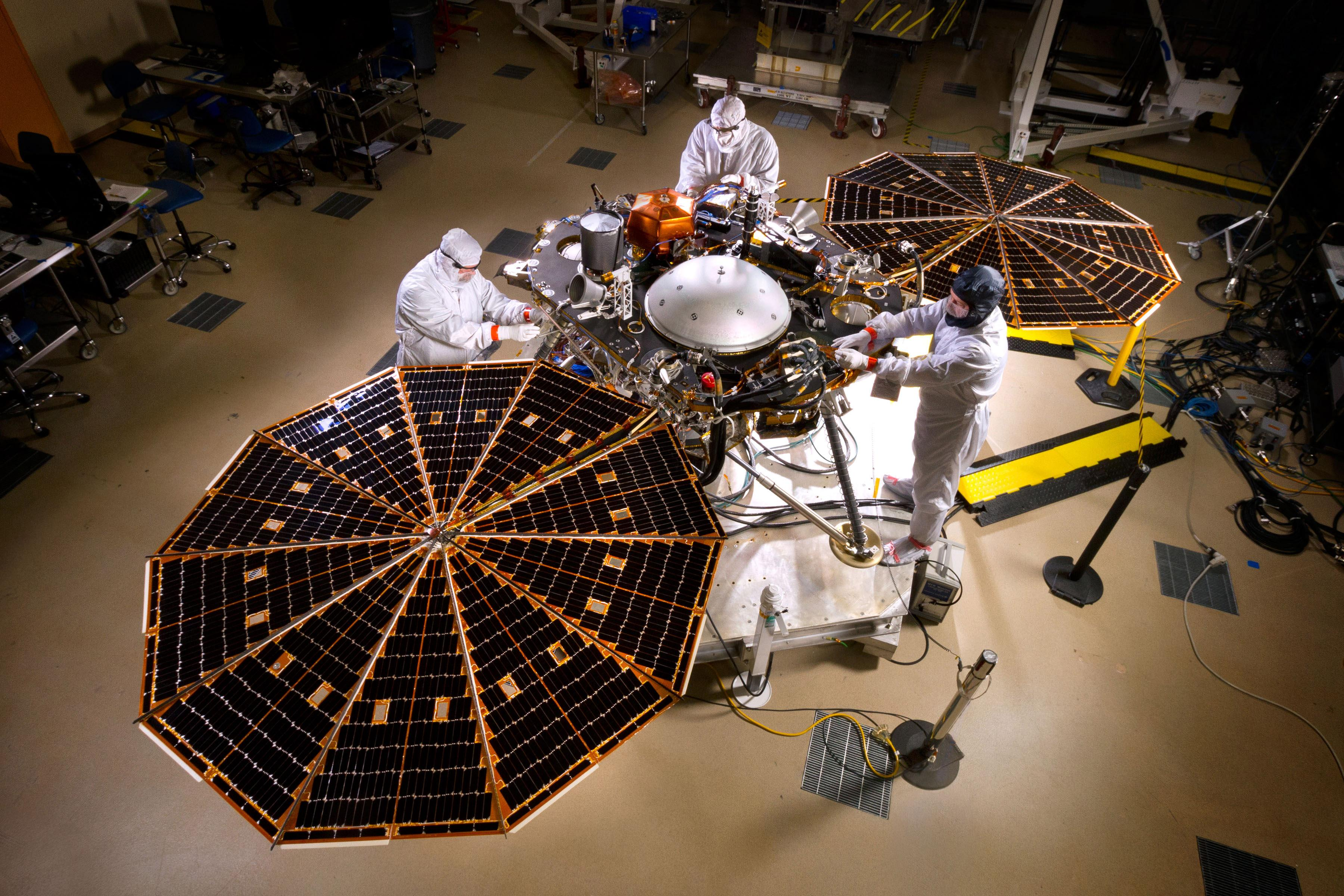
- The InSight lander with solar panels deployed in a cleanroom during preflight testing
- Names: InSight; GEMS; Discovery 12
- Mission type: Mars lander
- Operator: NASA / JPL
- COSPAR ID: 2018-042A
- SATCAT no.: 43457
- Website: science.nasa.gov
- Mission duration: Planned: 709 sols (2 years); Final: 1440 sols (4 years, 19 days)

Spacecraft properties
- Manufacturer: Lockheed Martin Space
- Launch mass: 694 kg (1,530 lb)
- Landing mass: 358 kg (789 lb)
- Dimensions: 6.0 × 1.56 × 1.0 m (19.7 × 5.1 × 3.3 ft) (deployed)
- Power: 600 watts (solar cells)

Start of mission
- Launch date: 5 May 2018, 11:05:01 UTC
- Rocket: Atlas V 401; AV-078
- Launch site: Vandenberg, SLC-3E
- Contractor: United Launch Alliance
- Entered service: 26 November 2018

End of mission
- Disposal: Decommissioned
- Declared: 21 December 2022
- Last contact: 15 December 2022 (official)

Mars lander
- Landing date: 26 November 2018, 19:52:59 UTC; MSD 51511 05:14 AMT
- Landing site: Elysium Planitia; 4.5024°N 135.6234°E

Flyby of Mars
- Spacecraft component: Mars Cube One (MarCO)
- Closest approach: 26 November 2018, 19:52:59 UTC
- Distance: 3,500 km (2,200 mi)
Instruments
- SEIS: Seismic Experiment for Interior Structure
- HP^{3}: Heat Flow and Physical Properties Package
- RISE: Rotation and Interior Structure Experiment
- TWINS: Temperature and Winds for InSight
- InSight mission logo Discovery Program Mars Exploration Program

The Interior Exploration using Seismic Investigations, Geodesy and Heat Transport (InSight) mission was a robotic lander designed to study the deep interior of the planet Mars. It was manufactured by Lockheed Martin Space, was managed by NASA's Jet Propulsion Laboratory (JPL), and two of its three scientific instruments were built by European agencies. InSight confirmed "marsquakes" on the planet and thus a still active interior.

The mission launched on 5 May 2018 at 11:05:01 UTC aboard an Atlas V-401 launch vehicle and successfully landed at Elysium Planitia on Mars on 26 November 2018 at 19:52:59 UTC. InSight was active on Mars for 1440 sols (1480 days; 4 years, 19 days).

InSight's objectives were to place a seismometer, called Seismic Experiment for Interior Structure (SEIS), on the surface of Mars to measure seismic activity and provide accurate 3D models of the planet's interior; and measure internal heat transfer using a heat probe called HP^{3} to study Mars's early geological evolution. This was intended to provide a new understanding of how the Solar System's terrestrial planets – Mercury, Venus, Earth, Mars – and Earth's Moon formed and evolved.

The lander was originally planned for launch in March 2016. An instrument problem delayed the launch beyond the 2016 launch window. NASA officials rescheduled the InSight launch to May 2018 and during the wait the instrument was repaired. This increased the total cost from US$675 million to US$830 million.

InSight successfully landed on Mars on 26 November 2018. Due to excessive dust on its solar panels preventing it from recharging, NASA put InSight in low-power mode for detecting seismic events in July 2022 and continued monitoring the lander through the operational period ending in December 2022. On 20 December 2022, NASA announced that the InSight lander had lost communications with Earth on 15 December 2022, with the end of the mission being declared on 21 December 2022.

== History ==
=== Discovery Program selection ===
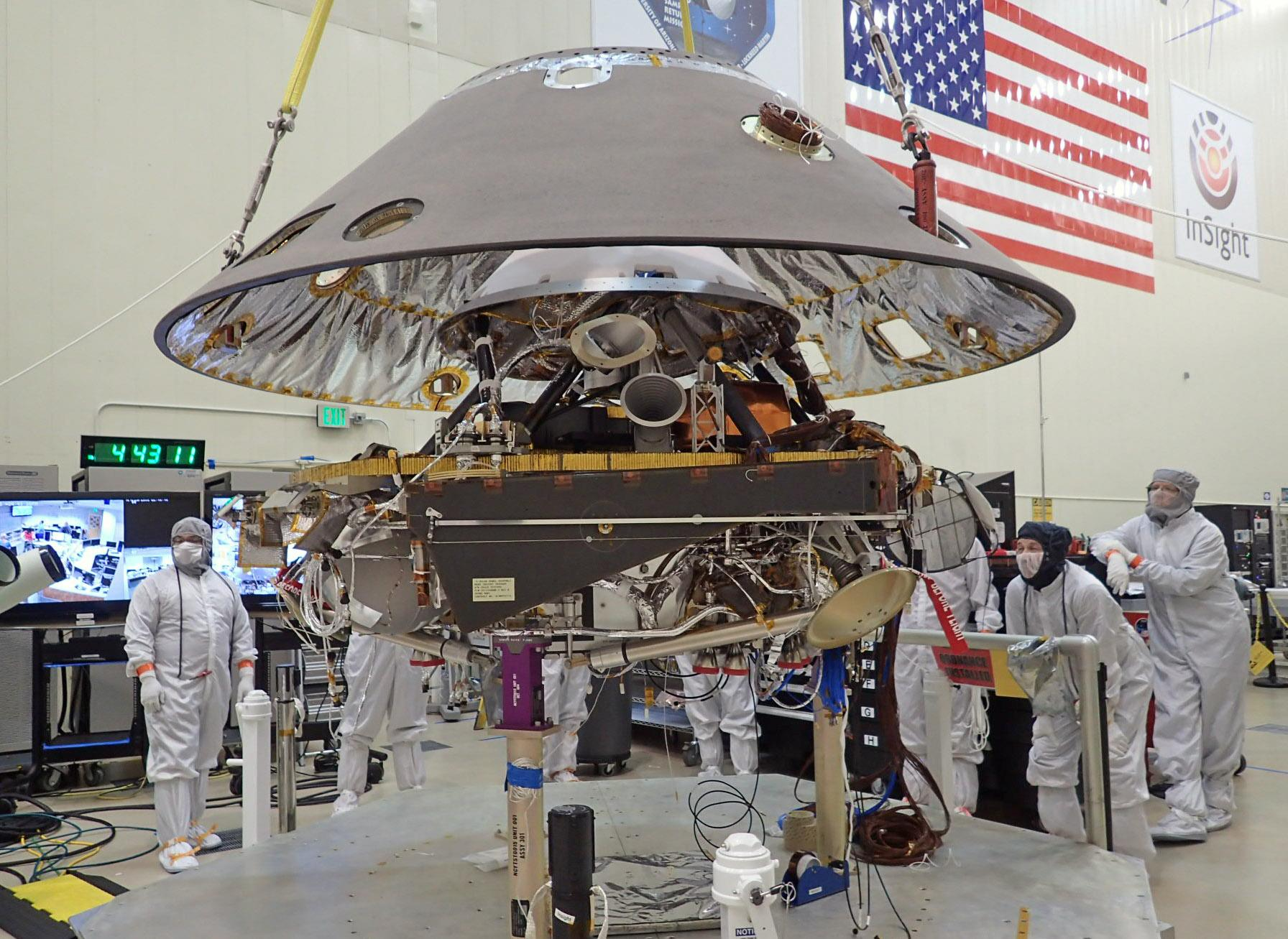
InSight comes together with the backshell and surface lander being joined, 2015.

InSight was initially known as GEMS (Geophysical Monitoring Station), but its name was changed in early 2012 following a request by NASA. Out of 28 proposals from 2010, it was one of the three Discovery Program finalists receiving $3 million in May 2011 to develop a detailed concept study. In August 2012, InSight was selected for development and launch. Managed by NASA's Jet Propulsion Laboratory (JPL) with participation from scientists from several countries, the mission was cost-capped at US$425 million, not including launch vehicle funding.

By reusing the landing system designed for the Mars Phoenix lander, which successfully landed on Mars in 2008, mission costs and risks were reduced.

=== Schedule issues ===
Lockheed Martin began construction of the lander on 19 May 2014, with general testing starting on 27 May 2015.

A persistent vacuum leak in the CNES-supplied seismometer known as the Seismic Experiment for Interior Structure (SEIS) led NASA to postpone the planned launch in March 2016 to May 2018. When InSight was delayed, the rest of the spacecraft was returned to Lockheed Martin's factory in Colorado for storage, and the Atlas V launch vehicle intended to launch the spacecraft was reassigned to the WorldView-4 mission.

On 9 March 2016, NASA officials announced that InSight would be delayed until the 2018 launch window at an estimated cost of US$150 million. The spacecraft was rescheduled to launch on 5 May 2018 for a Mars landing on 26 November 2018 at 20:00 UTC. The flight plan remained unchanged with launch using an Atlas V launch vehicle from Vandenberg Space Force Base in California. NASA's Jet Propulsion Laboratory was tasked with redesigning and building a new vacuum enclosure for the SEIS instrument, while CNES conducted instrument integration and testing.

On 22 November 2017, InSight completed testing in a thermal vacuum, also known as TVAC testing, where the spacecraft was put in simulated space conditions with reduced pressure and various thermal loads. On 23 January 2018, after a long storage, its solar panels were once again deployed and tested, and a second silicon chip containing 1.6 million names from the public was added to the lander.

=== Effects of Martian dust and end of operations ===
The InSight lander, powered by solar panels and batteries, relies on periodic wind gusts called "cleaning events" to reduce dust accumulation on the panels. Elysium Planitia, the landing site of InSight, experienced fewer cleaning events than needed to keep science operations powered. In February 2021, at the start of the Martian winter, InSight's solar cells were producing 27% of capacity due to a thick covering of dust on the panels. At that time, NASA began the process of putting the lander into hibernation mode, shutting down data-gathering instruments on a schedule to conserve enough power to keep the lander electronics warm through the Martian winter. NASA had hoped that weather conditions would improve and allow InSight to store enough energy to come out of hibernation in July 2021. In May 2021, some generation capacity was restored by using the arm to position sand so it could blow onto the solar panels and scour them clean.

NASA determined in May 2022 that there was too much dust on the panels to continue the mission. InSight was generating only one-tenth of the power from the sunlight than it did upon arrival. They put the lander in a low-power mode in July 2022 to continue monitoring for seismic events. NASA continued to monitor InSight until the end of 2022, when the spacecraft missed two consecutive communication attempts.

== Science background ==
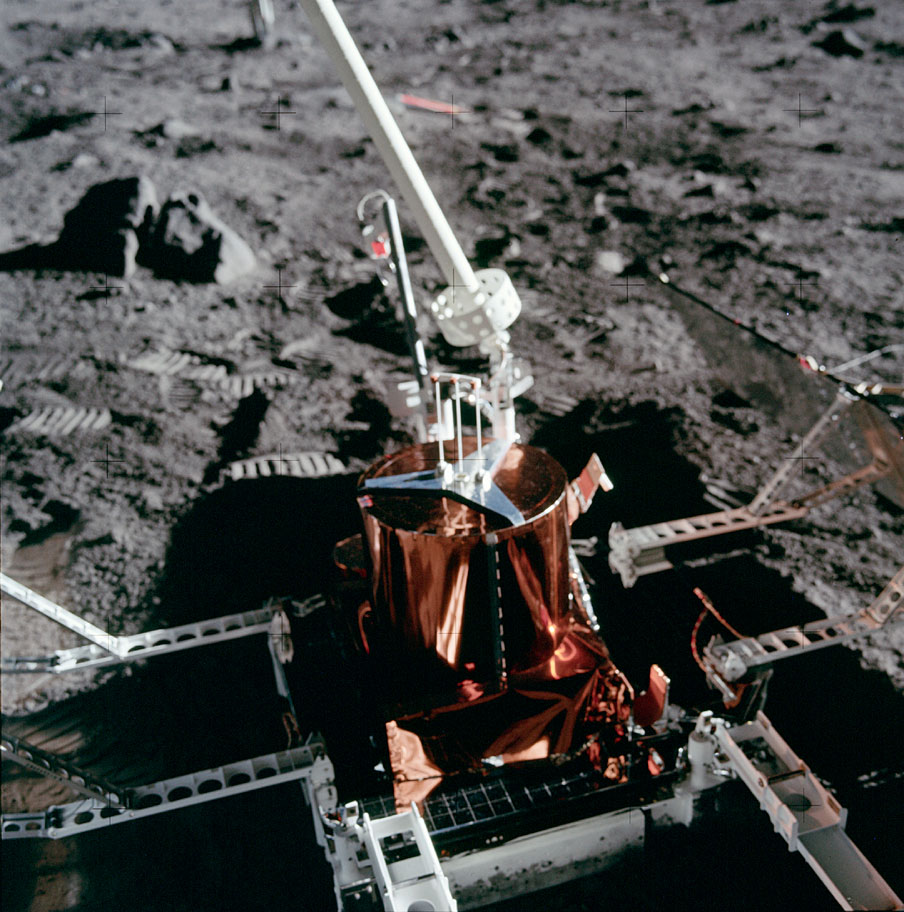
The Apollo 11 seismometer, 1969

=== Seismic vibrations ===
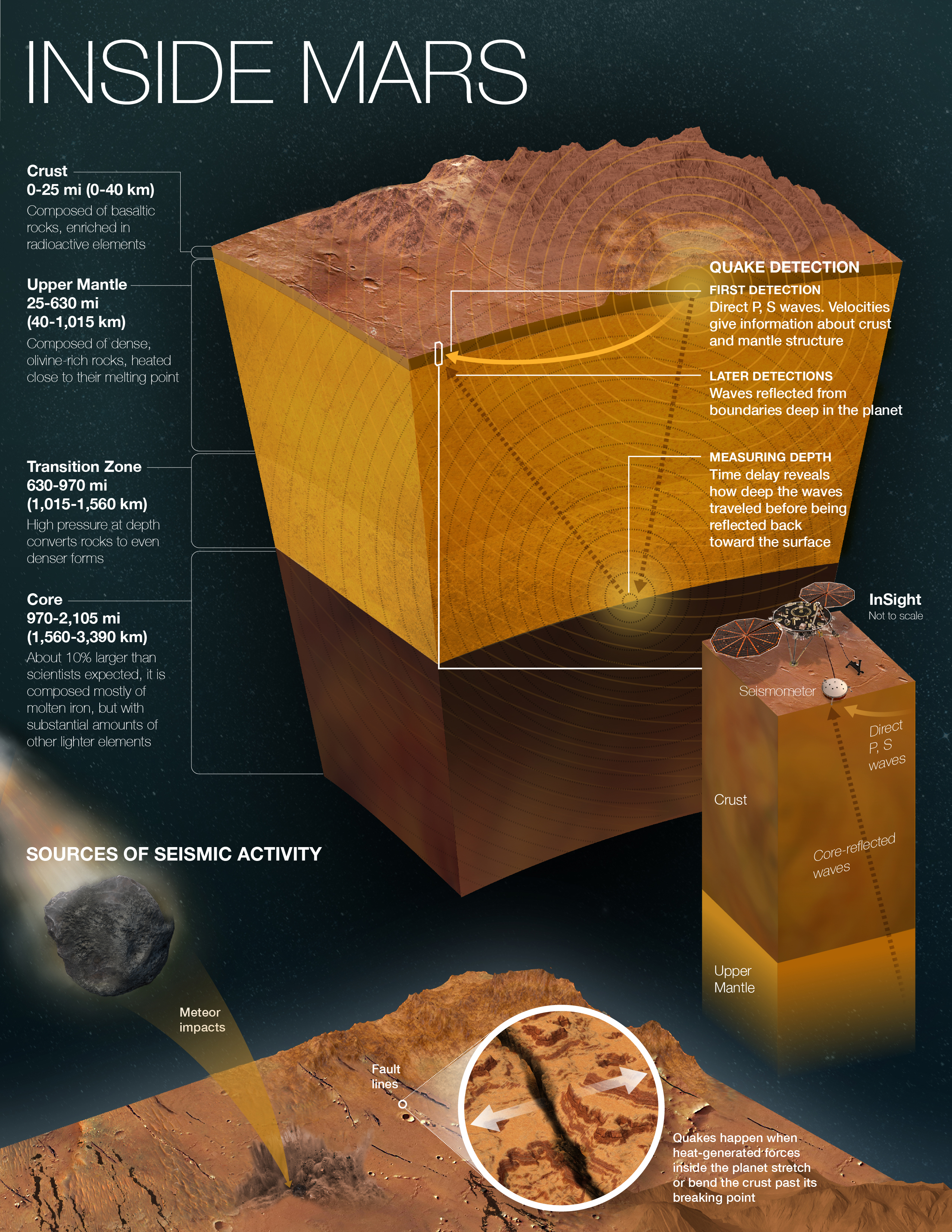
Inside Mars InfoGraphic Mars InSight Lander (17 May 2022)

Both Viking spacecraft carried seismometers mounted on their landers, and in 1976 vibrations were picked up from various lander operations and from the wind. However, the Viking 1 lander's seismometer did not deploy properly and did not unlock; the locked seismometer could not operate.

The Viking 2 seismometer unlocked; it operated and returned data to Earth. One problem was accounting for other data. On Sol 80, the Viking 2 seismometer detected an event. No wind data were recorded at the same time, so it was not possible to determine whether the data indicated a seismic event or wind gust. Other lacking data would have been useful to rule out other sources of vibrations. Two other problems were the location of the lander and that a certain level of wind on Mars caused a loss of sensitivity for the Viking 2 seismometer. To overcome these and other issues, InSight had many other sensors, was placed directly on the surface, and also had a windshield.

Despite the difficulties, the Viking 2 seismometer readings were used to estimate a Martian geological crust thickness between 14 and 18 km (8.7 and 11.2 mi) at the Viking 2 lander site. The Viking 2 seismometer did detect vibrations from Mars winds complementing the meteorology results. There was the aforementioned candidate for a possible marsquake, but it was not particularly definitive. The wind data did prove useful in its own right, and despite the limitations of the data, widespread and large marsquakes were not detected.

Seismometers were also left on the Moon, starting with Apollo 11 in 1969, and also by Apollo 12, 14, 15 and 16 missions and provided many insights into lunar seismology, including the discovery of moonquakes. The Apollo seismic network, which was operated until 1977, detected at least 28 moonquakes up to 5.5 on the Richter scale.

One of the aspects of the InSight mission was to compare the Earth, Moon, and Mars seismic data.

Well, seismic investigation is really the heart of this mission. Seismology is the method that we've used to gain almost everything we know, all the basic information about the interior of the Earth, and we also used it back during the Apollo era to understand and to measure sort of the properties of the inside of the moon. And so, we want to apply the same techniques but use the waves that are generated by Mars quakes, by meteorite impacts to probe deep into the interior of Mars all the way down to its core.

— Gravity Assist: Mars and InSight with Bruce Banerdt (3 May 2018)

On 4 May 2022, a large marsquake, estimated at magnitude 5, was detected by the seismometer on the InSight lander.

Mars quake detected (4 May 2022)
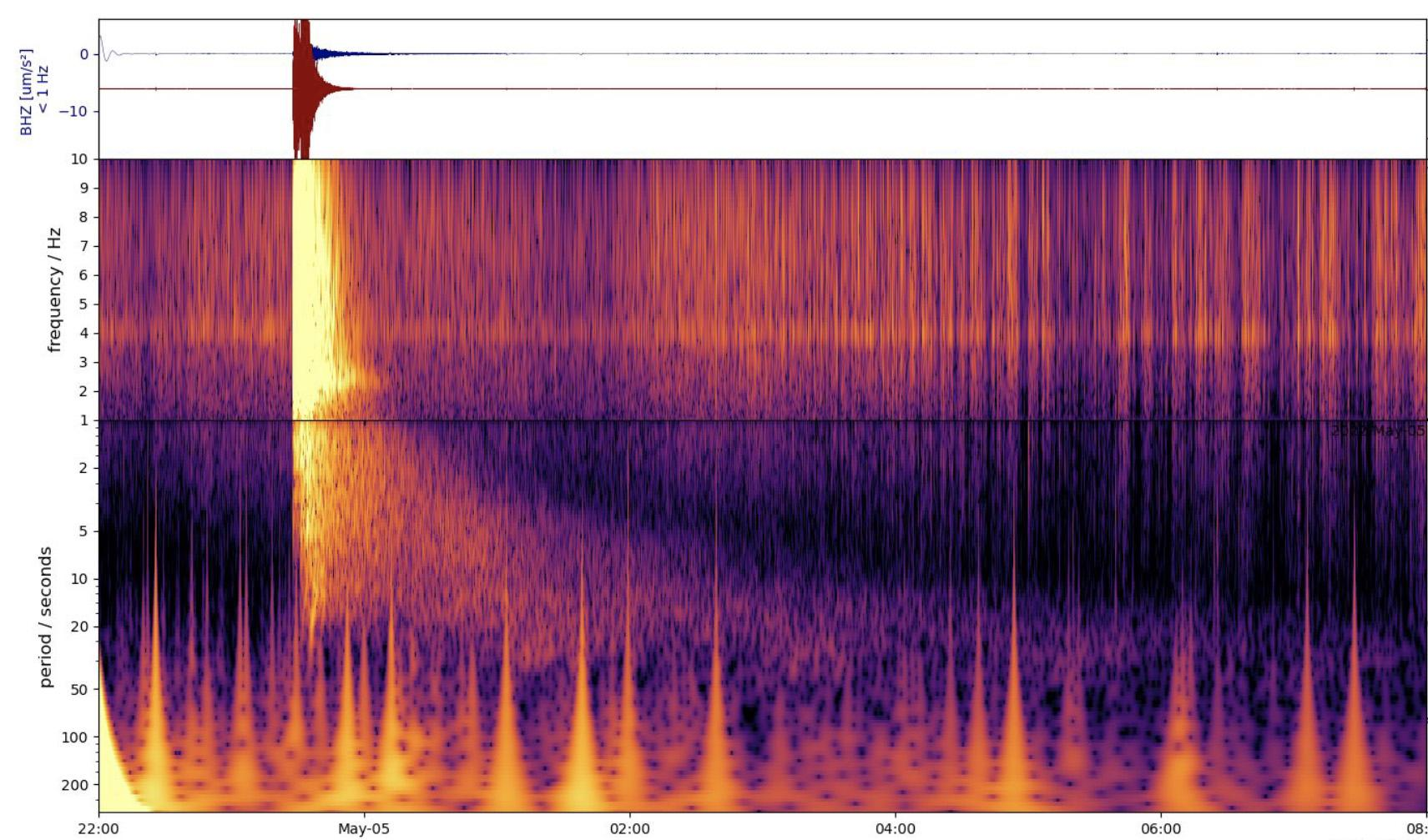
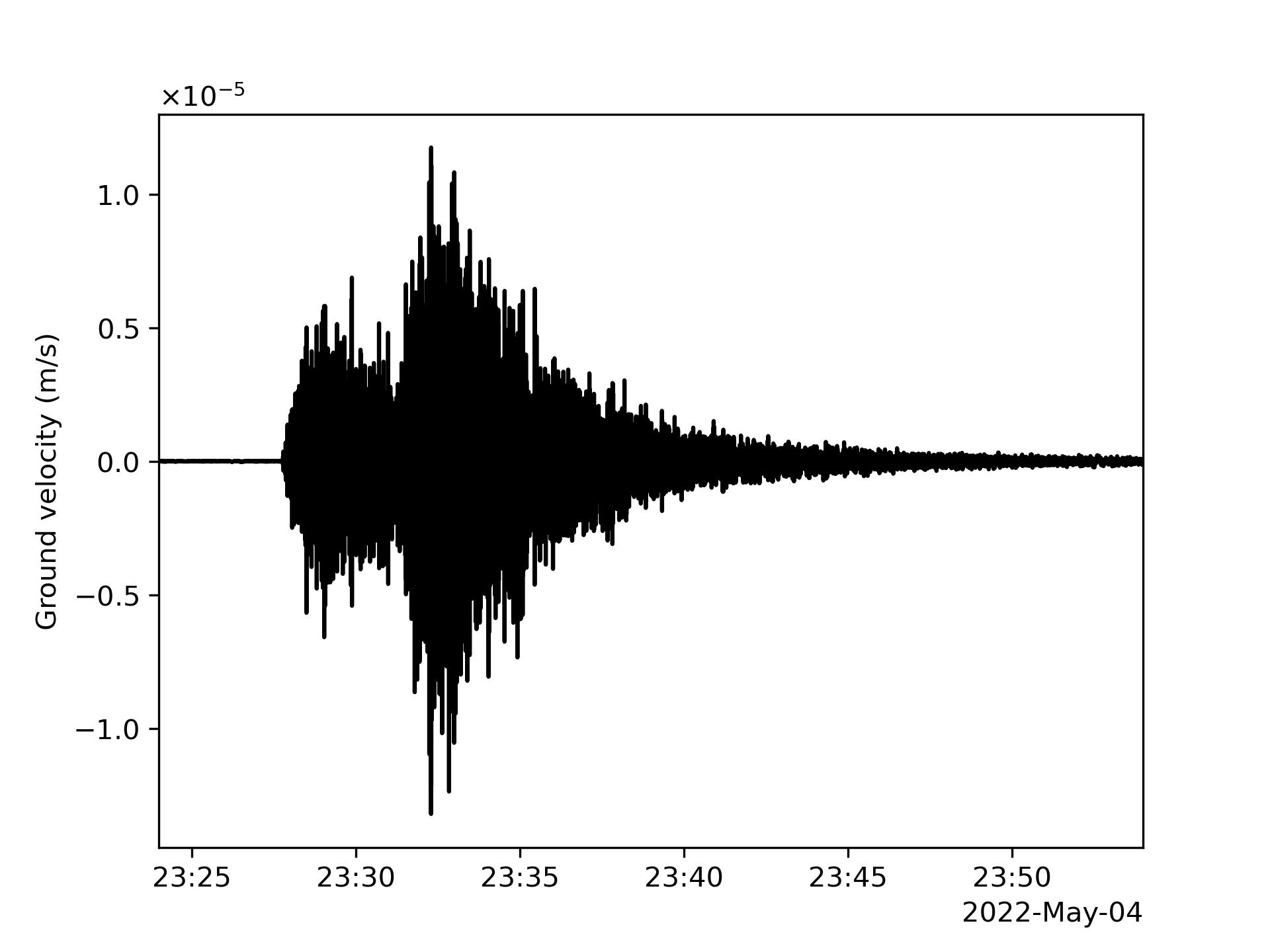

On 25 October 2023, scientists, helped by information from InSight, reported that the planet Mars has a radioactive magma ocean under its crust.

=== Planetary precession ===
Radio Doppler measurements were taken with Viking and twenty years later with Mars Pathfinder, and in each case the axis of rotation of Mars was estimated. By combining this data, the core size was constrained, because the change in axis of rotation over 20 years allowed a precession rate and from that the planet's moment of inertia to be estimated. InSight's measurements of crust thickness, mantle viscosity, core radius and density, and seismic activity were planned to result in a three- to tenfold increase in accuracy compared to previous data.

== Objectives ==
The InSight mission placed a single stationary lander on Mars to study its deep interior and address a fundamental issue of planetary and Solar System science: understanding the processes that shaped the rocky planets of the inner Solar System (including Earth) more than four billion years ago.

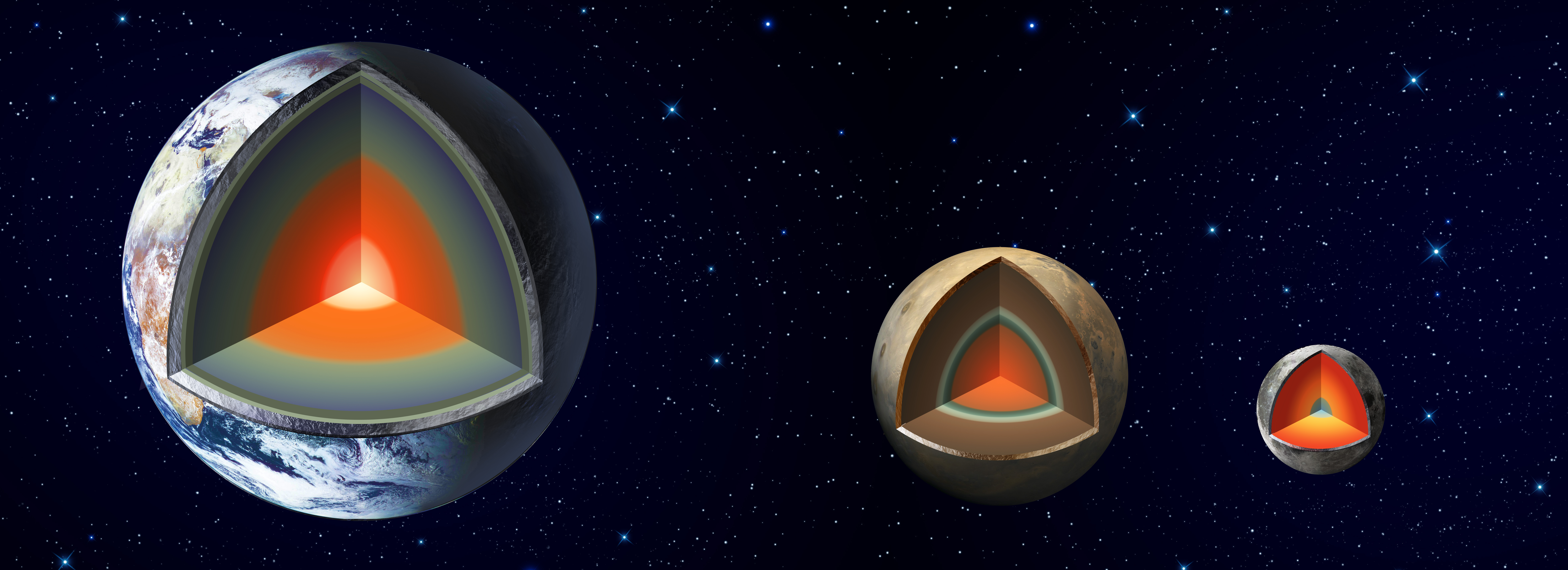
Comparison of the interiors of Earth, Mars and the Moon (artist concept)

InSight's primary objective was to study the earliest evolutionary processes that shaped Mars. By studying the size, thickness, density and overall structure of Mars's core, mantle and crust, as well as the rate at which heat escapes from the planet's interior, InSight was intended to provide a glimpse into the evolutionary processes of all of the rocky planets in the inner Solar System. The rocky inner planets share a common ancestry that begins with accretion. As the body increases in size, its interior heats up and evolves to become a terrestrial planet, containing a core, mantle and crust. Despite this common ancestry, each of the terrestrial planets is later shaped and molded through the poorly understood process of differentiation. InSight mission's goal was to improve the understanding of this process and, by extension, terrestrial evolution, by measuring the planetary building blocks shaped by this differentiation: a terrestrial planet's core, mantle and crust.

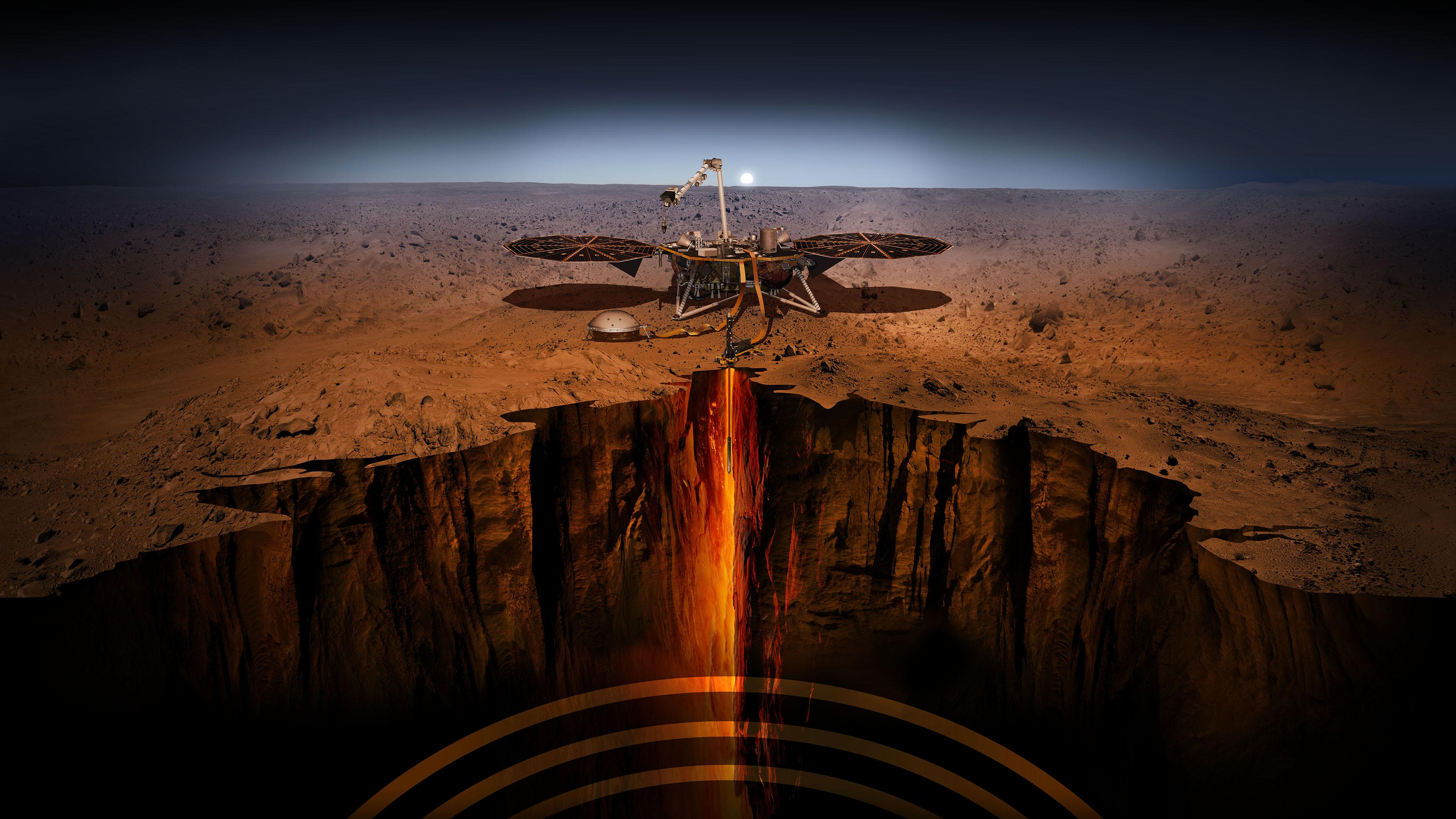
InSight lander on Mars (artist concept)

The mission was designed to determine if there is any seismic activity, measure the rate of heat flow from the interior, estimate the size of Mars's core and establish whether the core is liquid or solid. This data would be the first of its kind for Mars. It was also expected that frequent meteor airbursts (10–200 detectable events per year for InSight) would provide additional seismo-acoustic signals to probe the interior of Mars. The mission's secondary objective was to conduct an in-depth study of geophysics, tectonic activity and the effect of meteorite impacts on Mars, which could provide knowledge about such processes on Earth. Measurements of crust thickness, mantle viscosity, core radius and density, and seismic activity should result in a three- to tenfold increase in accuracy compared to current data. This was the first time a robotic lander dug this deep into the Martian crust.

In terms of fundamental processes shaping planetary formation, it is thought that Mars contains the most in-depth and accurate historical record, because it is big enough to have undergone the earliest accretion and internal heating processes that shaped the terrestrial planets, but small enough to have retained signs of those processes. The science phase is expected to last for two years.

In March 2021, NASA reported, based on measurements of over 500 Marsquakes by the InSight lander on the planet Mars, that the core of Mars is between 1,810 and 1,860 km (1,120 and 1,160 mi), about half the size of the core of Earth, and significantly smaller than thought earlier, suggesting a core of lighter elements.

== 2024 groundwater discovery ==
In August 2024, a reservoir of liquid water was discovered on Mars – deep in the rocky outer crust of the planet. The findings came from a new analysis of data from Nasa's Mars Insight Lander, which recorded four years' of vibrations – Mars quakes – from deep inside the Red Planet. The analysis revealed reservoirs of water at depths of about six to 12 miles (10 to 20km) in the Martian crust.

As per estimates, there may be enough water, trapped in tiny cracks and pores of rock in the middle of the Martian crust, to fill oceans on the planet's surface. The groundwater would likely cover the entirety of Mars to a depth of 1 mile (1.6 kilometers), the study found.

== Design ==
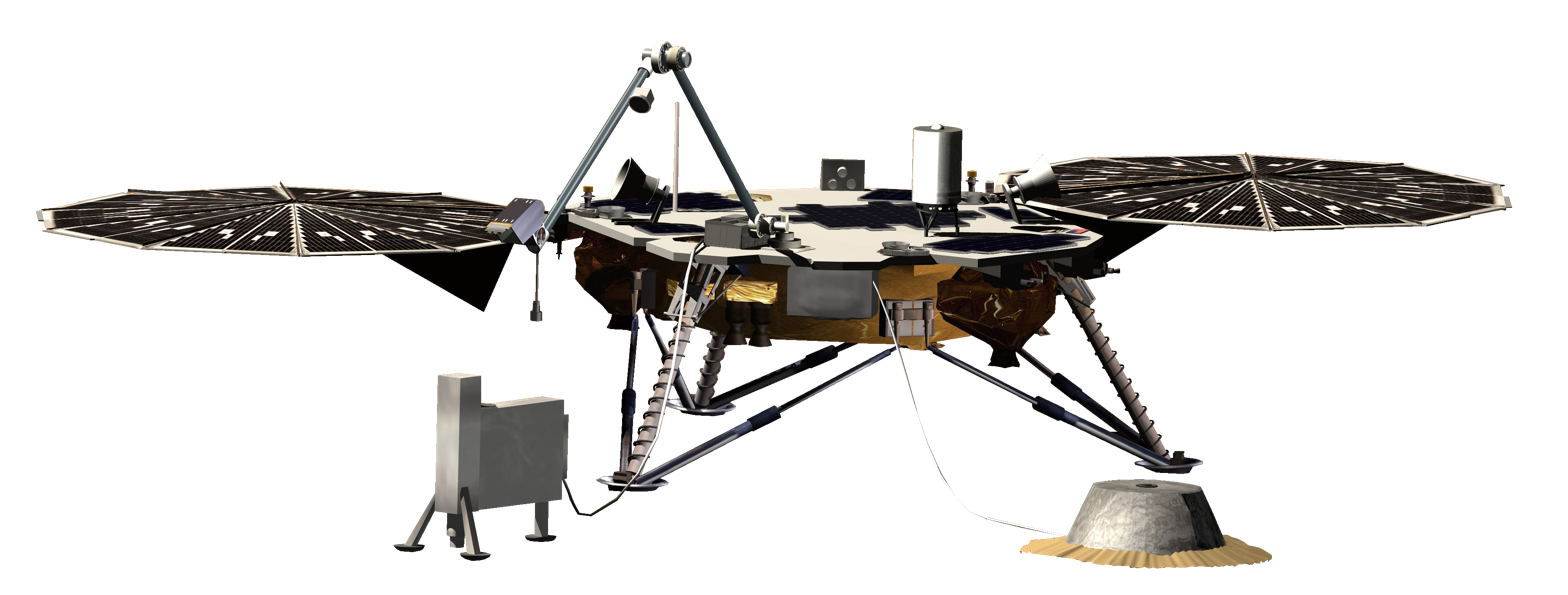
Artist's rendering of the InSight lander

The mission further developed a design based on the 2008 Phoenix Mars lander. Because InSight was powered by solar panels, it landed near the equator to enable maximum power for a projected lifetime of two years (1 Martian year). The mission included two relay microsatellites called Mars Cube One (MarCO) that launched with InSight but were flying in formation with InSight to Mars.

Three major aspects to the InSight spacecraft were the cruise stage, the entry, descent, and landing system, and the lander.

=== Overall specifications ===
Mass

- Total mass during cruise: 694 kg (1,530 lb)
  - Lander: 358 kg (789 lb)
  - Aeroshell: 189 kg (417 lb) Aeroshell Diameter (backshell and heat shield) : 2.64 meters (8.67 ft)
  - Cruise stage: 79 kg (174 lb)
  - Propellant and pressurant: 67 kg (148 lb)
- Relay probes flew separately but they weighed 13.5 kg (30 lb) each (there were 2)

=== Lander specifications ===
- Lander mass: 358 kg (789 lb) including about 50 kg of science payload.
  - Mars weight (0.376 of Earth's): 1,320 N (300 lbf)
- About 6.0 m (19.7 ft) wide with solar panels deployed.
- The science deck is about 1.56 m (5.1 ft) wide and between 0.83 and 1.08 m (2.7 and 3.5 ft) high (depending on leg compression after landing).
- The length of the robotic arm is 1.8 m (5.9 ft)
- Tilt of lander at landing on Mars: 4°

==== Power ====
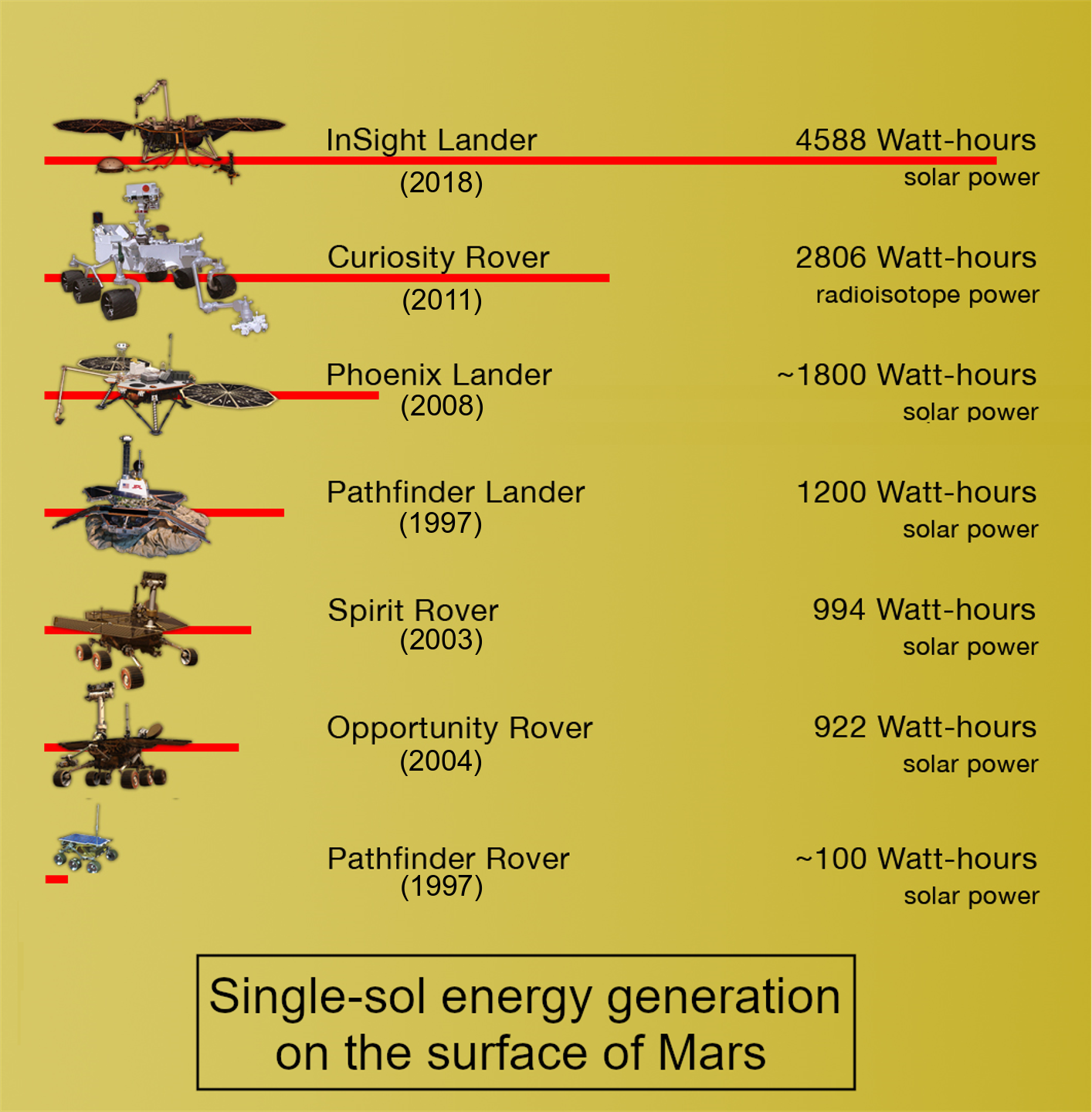
Comparison of single-sol energy generated by various probes on Mars (30 November 2018)

Power is generated by two round solar panels, each 2.15 m (7.1 ft) in diameter when unfurled, and consisting of SolAero ZTJ triple-junction solar cells made of InGaP/InGaAs/Ge arranged on Orbital ATK UltraFlex arrays. After touchdown on the Martian surface, the arrays are deployed by opening like a folding fan.

- Rechargeable batteries
- Solar panels yielded 4.6 kilowatt-hours on Sol 1

=== Payload ===
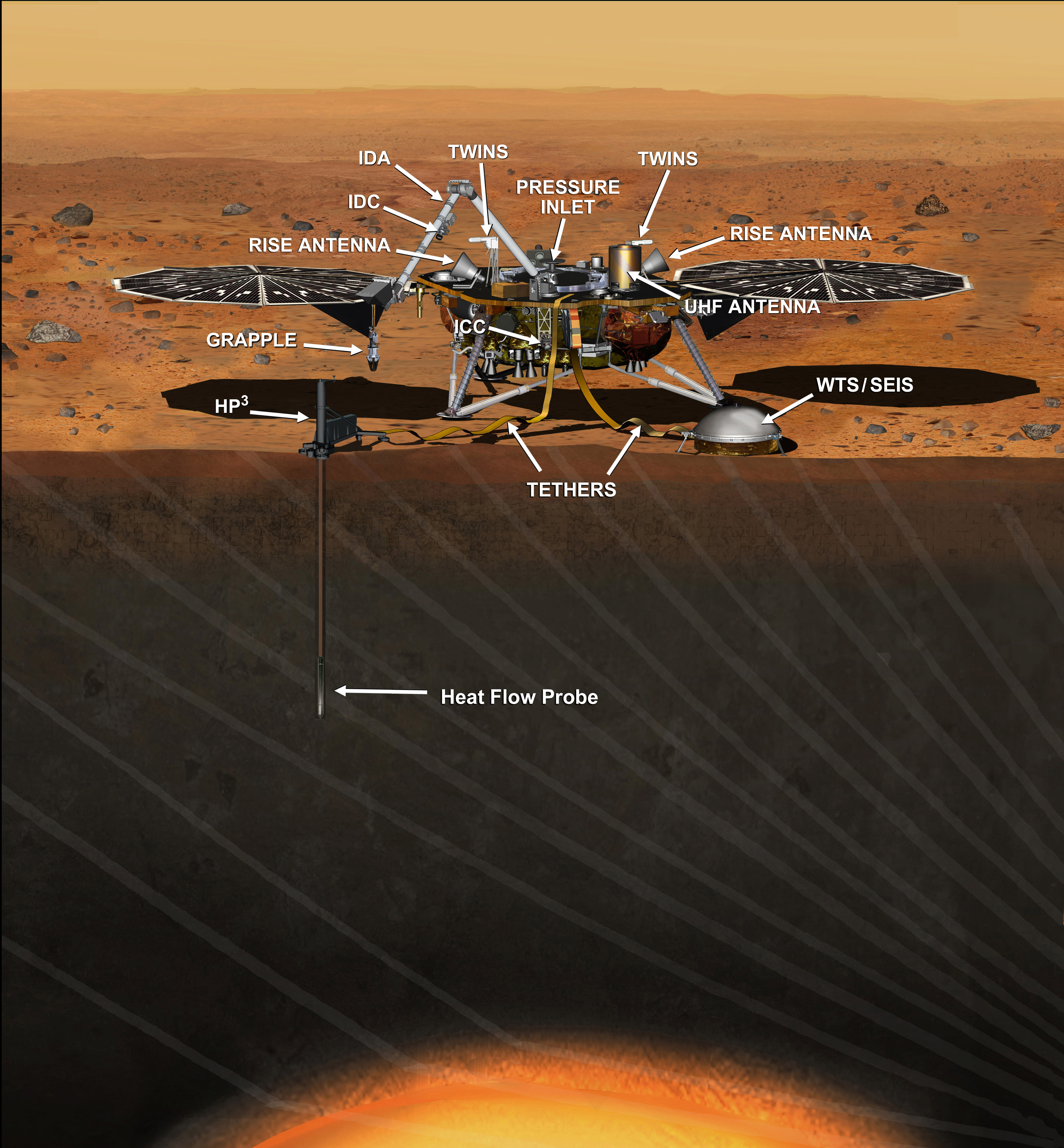
The InSight lander with labeled instruments

An animation of HP^{3} mole burrowing into Mars

InSight's lander payload had a total mass of 50 kg (110 lb), including science instruments and support systems such as the Auxiliary Payload Sensor Suite, cameras, the instrument deployment system, and a laser retroreflector.

InSight performed three major experiments using SEIS, HP^{3} and RISE. SEIS is a very sensitive seismometer, measuring vibrations; HP^{3} involves a burrowing probe to measure the thermal properties of the subsurface. RISE uses the radio communication equipment on the lander and on Earth to measure the overall movement of planet Mars that could reveal the size and density of its core.

- The Seismic Experiment for Interior Structure (SEIS) measured marsquakes and other internal activity on Mars, and the response to meteorite impacts, to better understand the planet's history and structure. SEIS was provided by the French Space Agency (CNES), with the participation of the Institut de Physique du Globe de Paris (IPGP), the Swiss Federal Institute of Technology (ETH), the Max Planck Institute for Solar System Research (MPS), Imperial College, Institut supérieur de l'aéronautique et de l'espace (ISAE) and JPL. The seismometer can also detect sources including atmospheric waves and tidal forces from Mars's moon Phobos. A leak in SEIS in 2016 had forced a two-year mission postponement. The SEIS instrument is supported by meteorological tools including a vector magnetometer provided by UCLA that measures magnetic disturbances, air temperature, wind speed and wind direction sensors based on the Spanish/Finnish Rover Environmental Monitoring Station; and a barometer from JPL.
- The Heat Flow and Physical Properties Package (HP^{3}), provided by the German Aerospace Center (DLR) included a radiometer and a heat flow probe. The probe, referred to as a "self-hammering nail" and nicknamed "the mole", was designed to burrow 5 m (16 ft) below the Martian surface while trailing a tether, with embedded heat sensors to study the thermal properties of Mars's interior, and thus reveal unique information about the planet's geologic history. The hammering mechanism inside the mole was designed by the Polish company Astronika and the Space Research Centre of the Polish Academy of Sciences under contract and in cooperation with DLR. The tether contains precise temperature sensors every 10 cm (3.9 in) to measure the temperature profile of the subsurface.
- The Rotation and Interior Structure Experiment (RISE) led by the Jet Propulsion Laboratory (JPL), was a radio science experiment that uses the lander's X band radio to provide precise measurements of planetary rotation to better understand the interior of Mars. X band radio tracking, capable of an accuracy under 2 cm (0.79 in), builds on previous Viking program and Mars Pathfinder data. The previous data allowed the core size to be estimated, but with more data from InSight, the nutation amplitude can be determined. Once spin axis direction, precession, and nutation amplitudes are better understood, it should be possible to calculate the size and density of the Martian core and mantle. This should increase the understanding of the formation of terrestrial planets (e.g. Earth) and rocky exoplanets.
- Temperature and Winds for InSight (TWINS), fabricated by the Spanish Astrobiology Center, monitors weather at the landing site.
- Laser RetroReflector for InSight (LaRRI) is a corner cube retroreflector provided by the Italian Space Agency and mounted on InSight's top deck. It enables passive laser range-finding by orbiters after the lander is retired, and will function as a node in a proposed Mars geophysical network. This device previously flew on the Schiaparelli lander as the Instrument for Landing-Roving Laser Retroreflector Investigations (INRRI), and is an aluminum dome 54 mm (2.1 in) in diameter and 25 g (0.9 oz) in mass featuring eight fused silica reflectors.
- Instrument Deployment Arm (IDA) is a 1.8 m (5.9 ft) robotic arm that deployed the SEIS, wind and thermal shield, and HP^{3} instruments to Mars's surface. It is a 4 DOF motorized manipulator, constructed from carbon-fiber composite tubes. Originally intended for the canceled Mars Surveyor mission, the IDA features a scoop, wax actuated grappling claw, and the IDC camera.
- The Instrument Deployment Camera (IDC) is a color camera based on the Mars Exploration Rover and Mars Science Laboratory navcam design. It is mounted on the Instrument Deployment Arm and images the instruments on the lander's deck and provides stereoscopic views of the terrain surrounding the landing site. It features a 45° field of view and uses a 1024 × 1024 pixel CCD detector. The IDC sensor was originally black and white for best resolution; a program was enacted that tested with a standard Hazcam and, since development deadlines and budgets were met, it was replaced with a color sensor.
- The Instrument Context Camera (ICC) is a color camera based on the MER/MSL Hazcam design. It is mounted below the lander's deck, and with its wide-angle 120° panoramic field of view provides a complementary view of the instrument deployment area. Like the IDC, it uses a 1024 × 1024 pixel CCD detector.

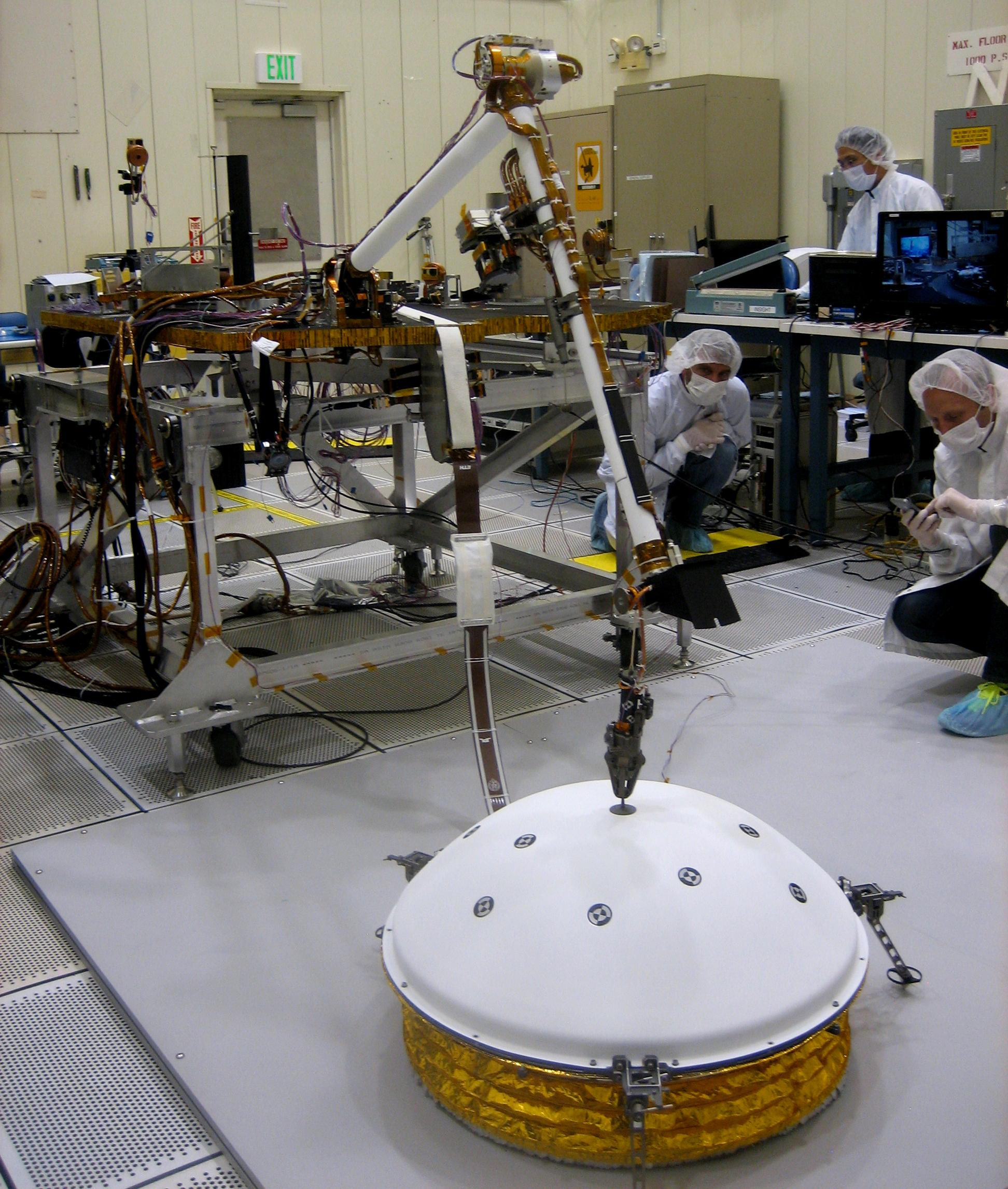
A test of the 2.4 meter long Instrument Deployment Arm, seen deploying SEIS

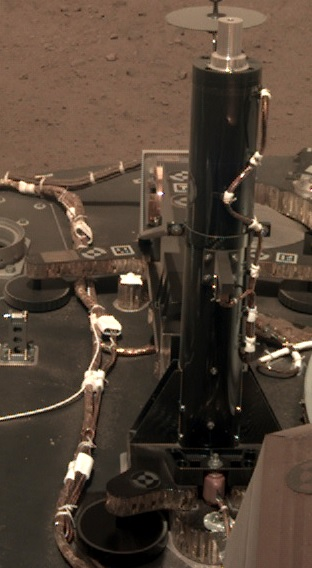
HP^{3} on the lander deck on Sol 10

HP^{3} diagram

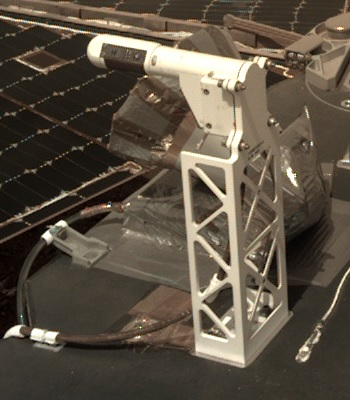
TWINS meteorological sensor

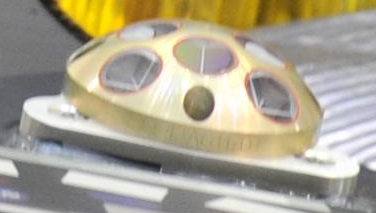
LaRRI, the laser retroreflector on InSight's deck

The two relay 6U cubesats were part of the overall InSight program, and were launched at the same time as the lander but they were attached to the centaur upper stage (InSight's second stage in the launch). They were ejected from the stage after launch and coasted to Mars independent of the main InSight cruise stage with the lander.

=== Twin Lander ===
JPL also built a full-scale engineering model, named ForeSight. This was used to practice instrument deployment, trial new ways to deploy the HP^{3} instrument, and test methods to reduce seismometer noise.

With the mission now ended, the testbed is being scrapped and its parts will be offered to other teams such as the Mars Sample Retrieval Lander (SRL) for the Mars Sample Return campaign at JPL to be repurposed for their own needs. Anything that is not needed will go into storage. As of now, no attempt is planned to be undertaken to restore ForeSight or to send it to a museum.

== Journey to Mars ==
=== Launch ===
On 28 February 2018, InSight was shipped via C-17 cargo aircraft from the Lockheed Martin Space building in Denver to Vandenberg Air Force Base in California in order to be integrated to the launch vehicle. The lander was launched on 5 May 2018 and arrived on Mars at approximately 19:54 UTC on 26 November 2018.

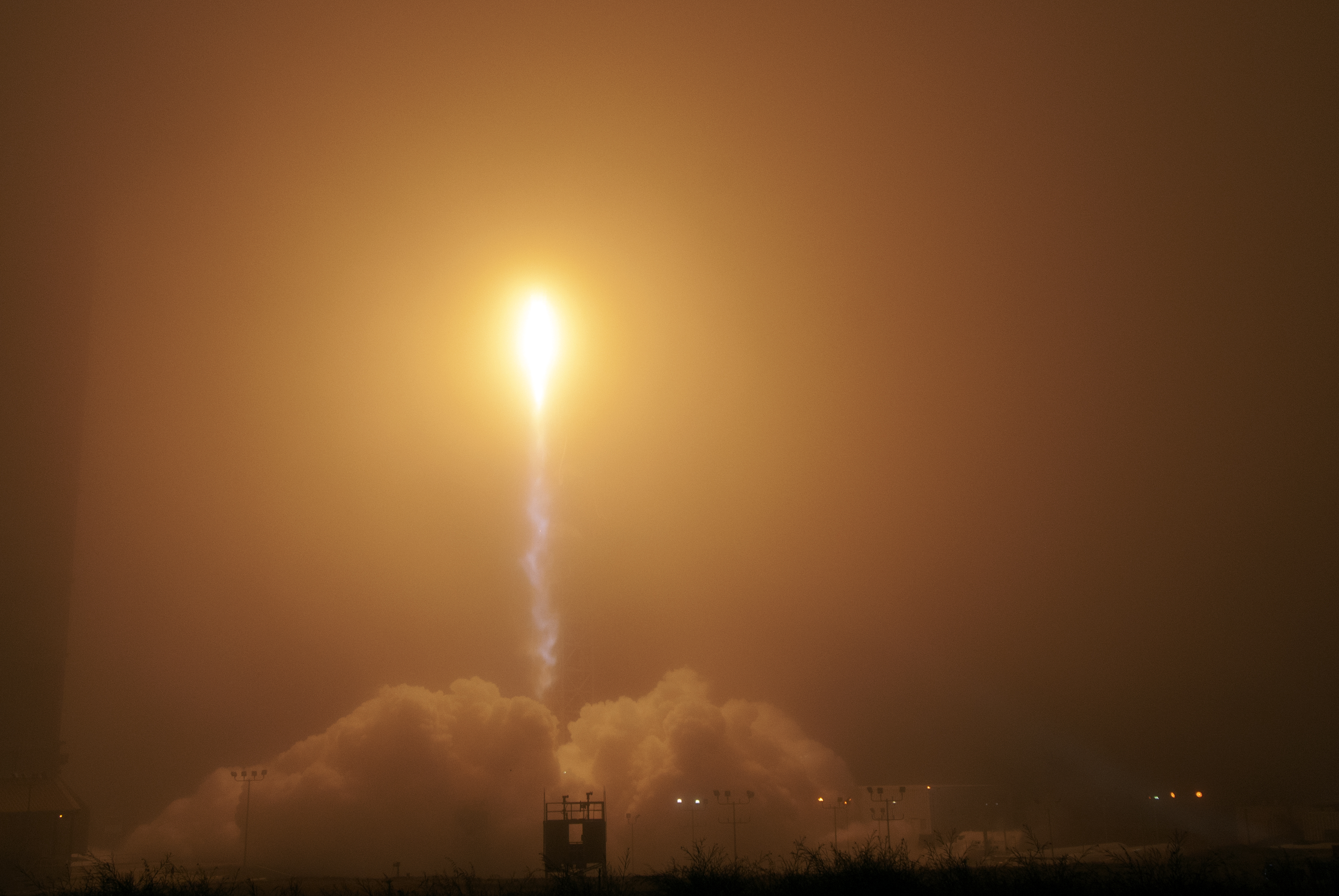
The launch of the Atlas V rocket carrying InSight and MarCO from Vandenberg Space Launch Complex 3-E

The spacecraft was launched on 5 May 2018 at 11:05 UTC on an Atlas V 401 launch vehicle (AV-078) from Vandenberg Air Force Base Space Launch Complex 3-East. This was the first American interplanetary mission to launch from California.

The launch was managed by NASA's Launch Services Program. InSight was originally scheduled for launch on 4 March 2016 on an Atlas V 401 (4 meter fairing/zero (0) solid rocket boosters/single (1) engine Centaur) from Vandenberg Air Force Base in California, U.S., but was called off in December 2015 due to a vacuum leak on the SEIS instrument. The rescheduled launch window ran from 5 May to 8 June 2018.

Major components of the launch vehicle include:

- Common Core Booster
- This launch did not use additional solid rocket boosters
- Centaur with Relay CubeSats
- InSight in a Payload fairing

The journey to Mars took 6.5 months across 484 million km (301 million mi) for a touchdown on 26 November. After a successful landing, a three-month-long deployment phase commenced as part of its two-year (a little more than one Martian year) prime mission.

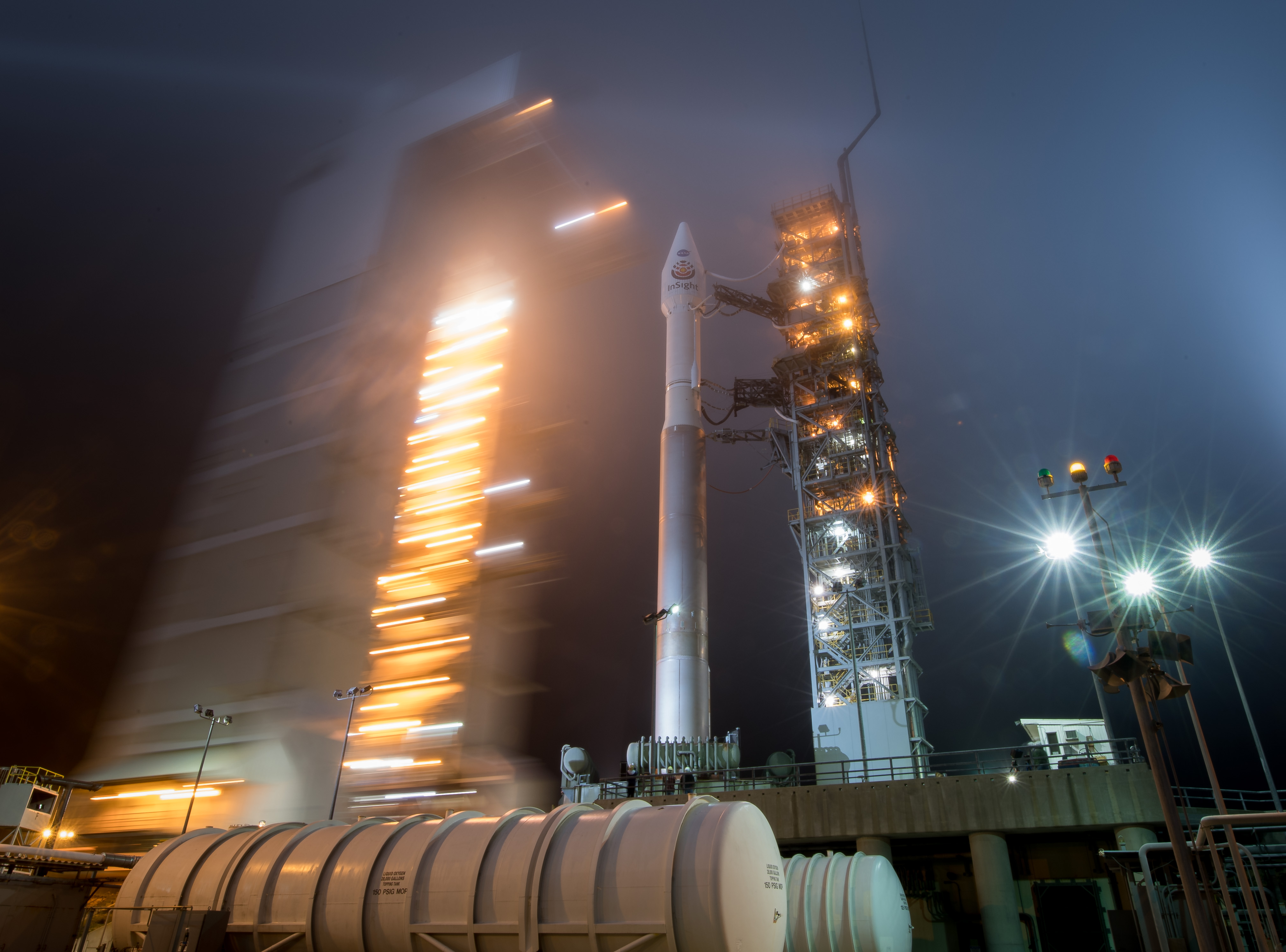
Service tower rolls back.

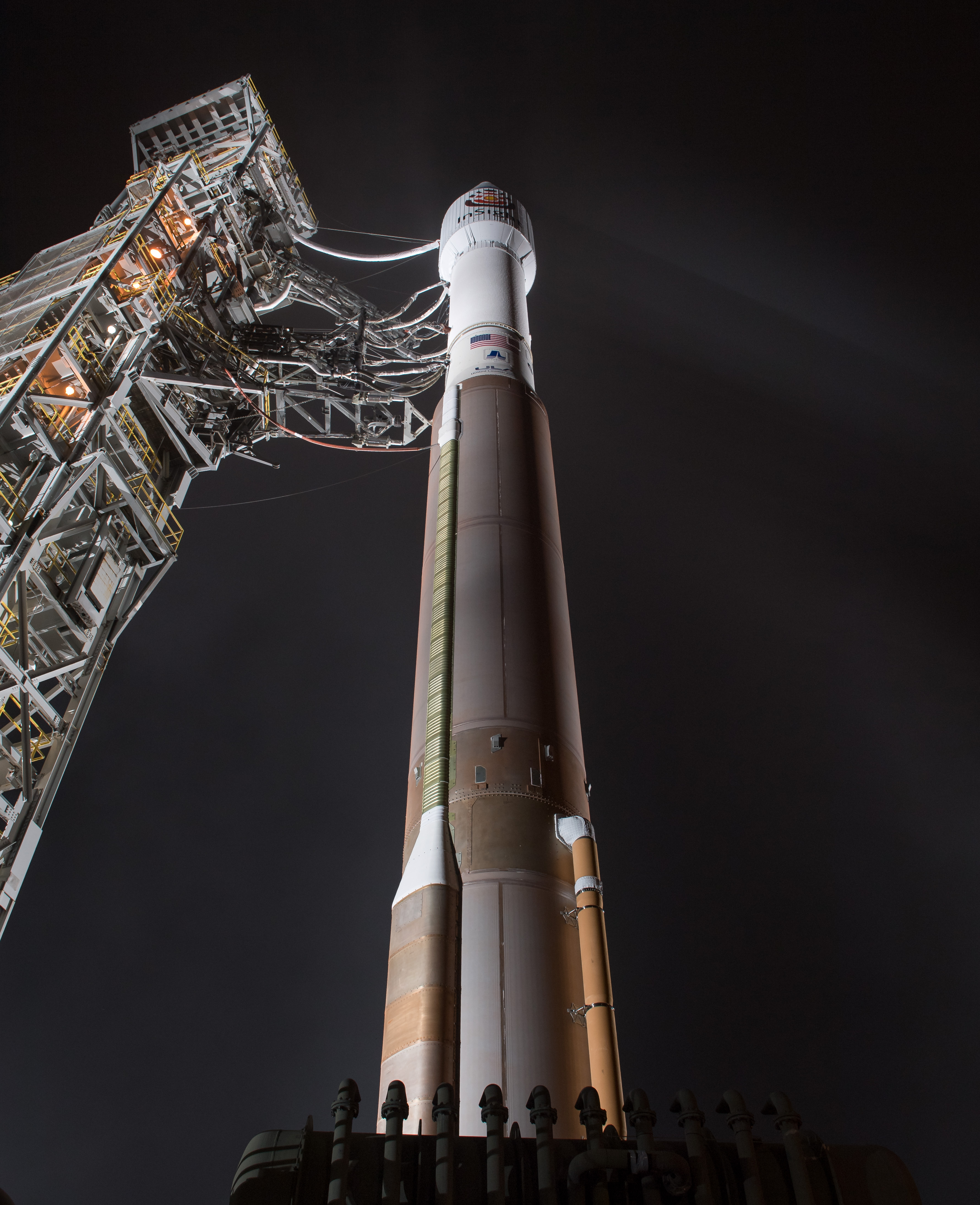
Pre-launch

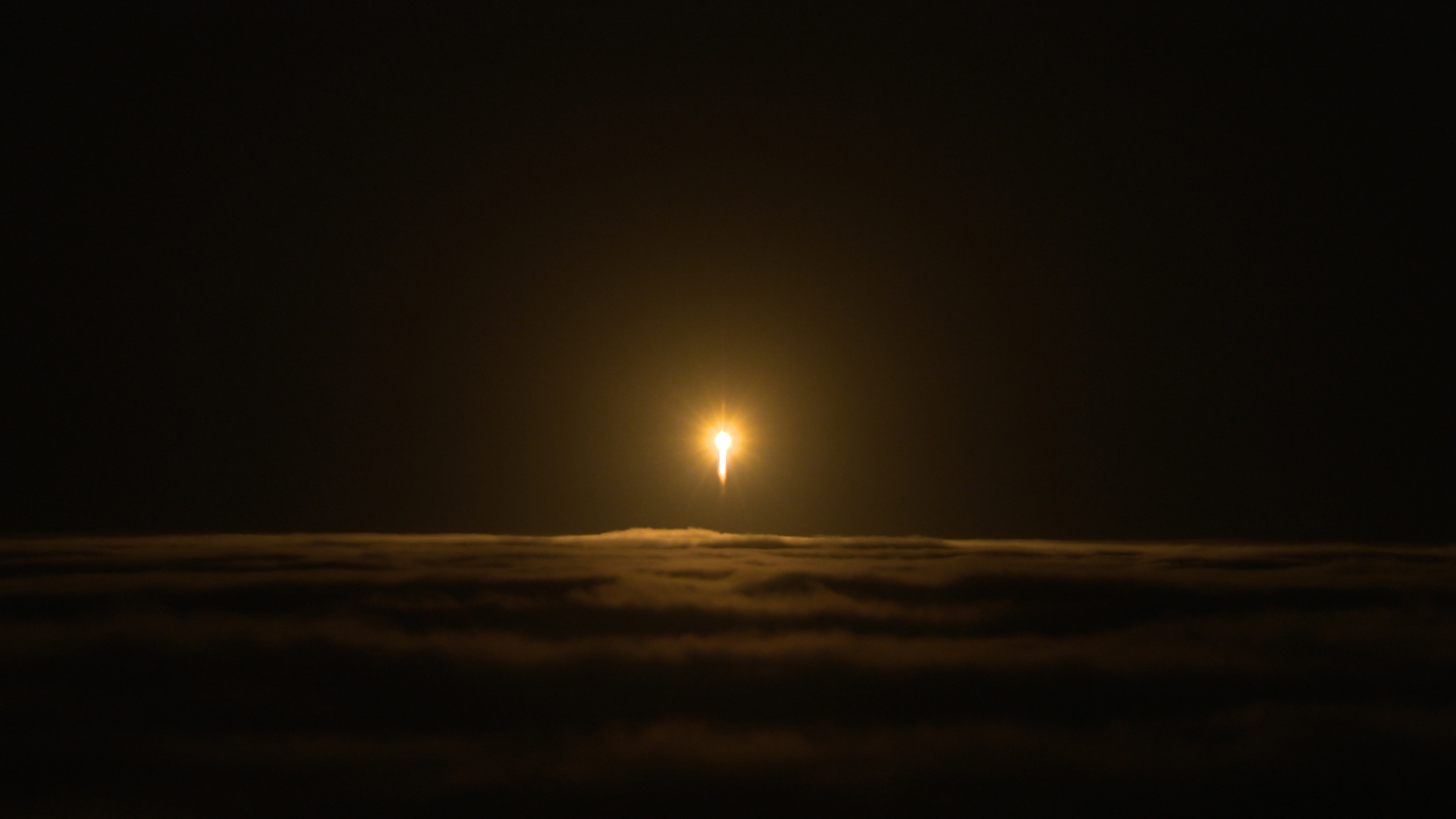
InSight heading to space

InSight on way to Mars

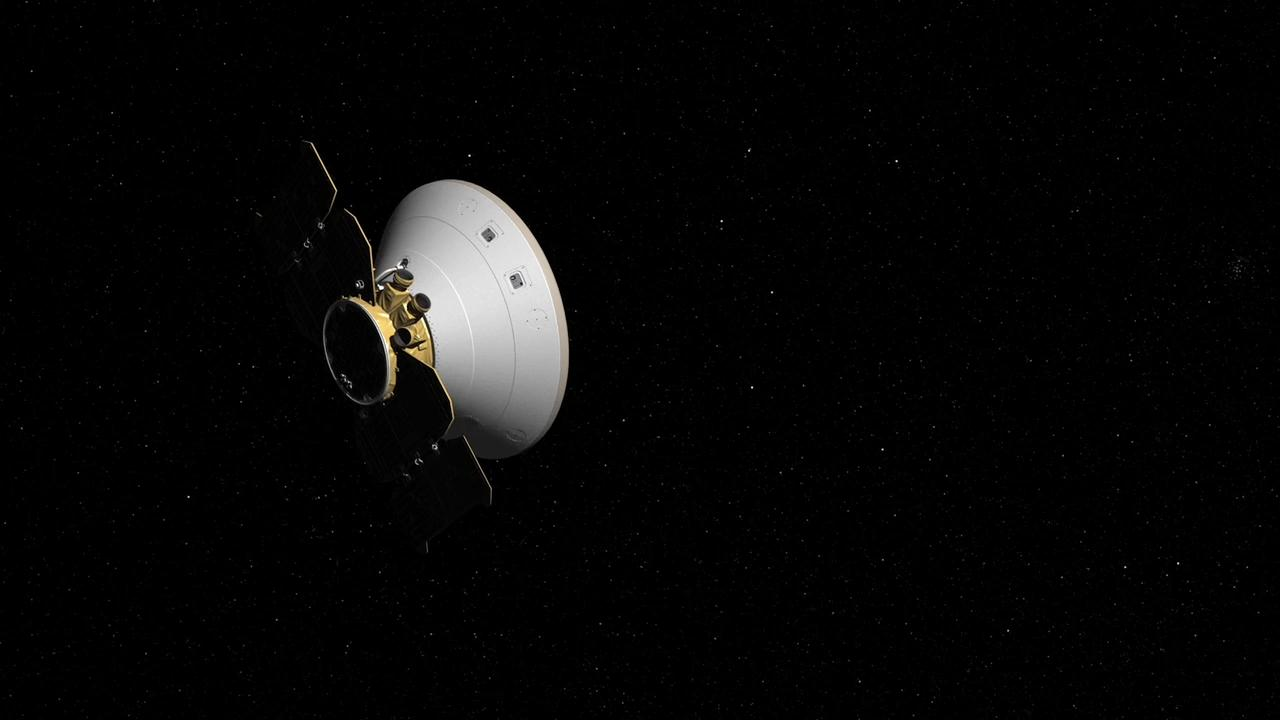
Exterior (artist concept)

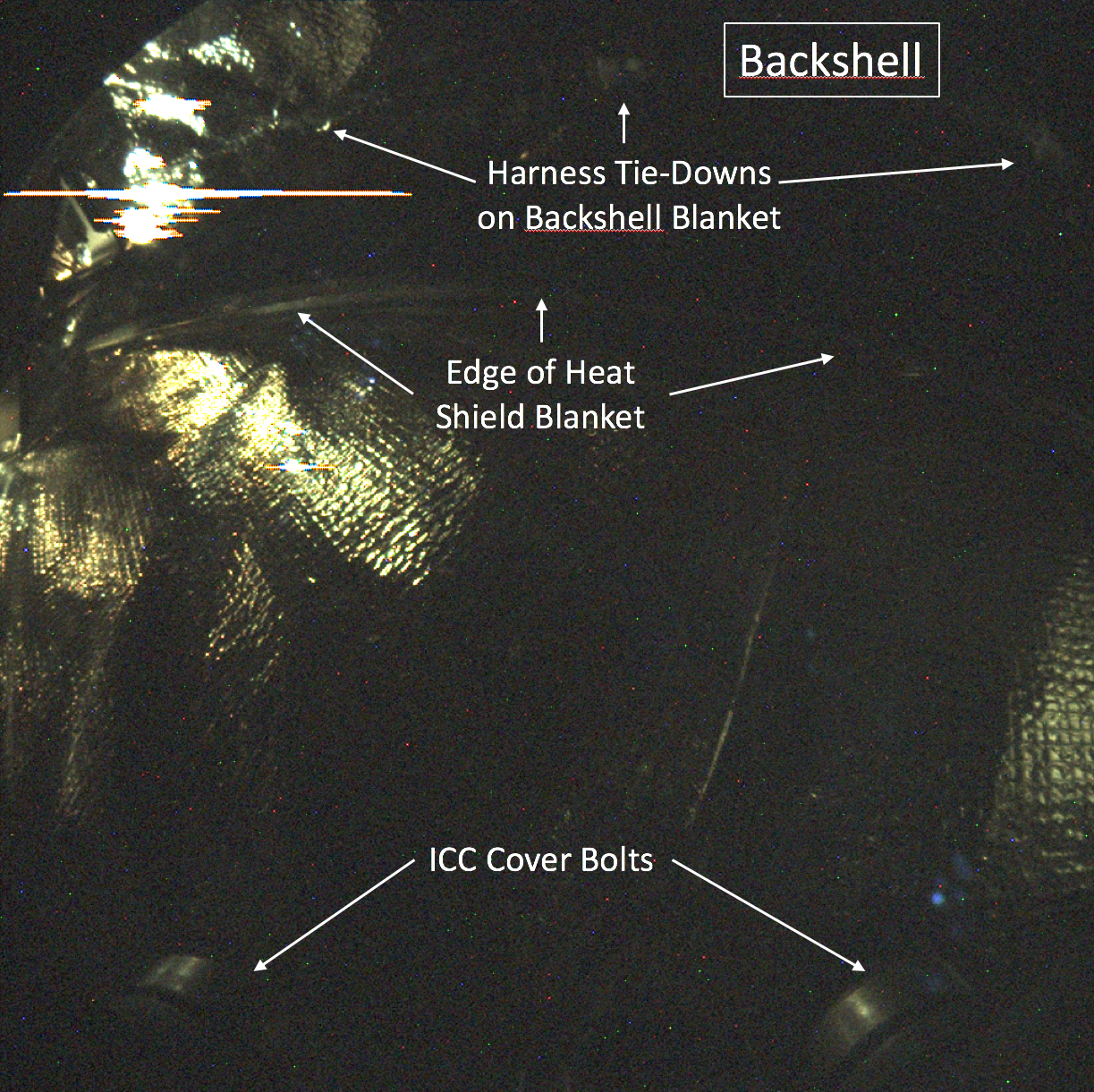
Interior

=== Cruise ===
An animation of InSight's trajectory from 5 May 2018 to 26 November 2018: InSight · Earth · Mars

After its launch from Earth on 5 May in 2018, it coasted through interplanetary space for 6.5 months traveling across 484 million km (301 million mi) for a touchdown on 26 November in that year.

InSight cruise stage departed Earth at a speed of 10,000 kilometres per hour (6,200 mph). The MarCo probes were ejected from the 2nd stage Centaur booster and traveled to Mars independent of the InSight cruise stage, but they were all launched together.

During the cruise to Mars, the InSight cruise stage made several course adjustments, and the first of these (TCM-1) took place on 22 May 2018. The cruise stage that carries the lander includes solar panels, antenna, star trackers, Sun sensor, inertial measurement unit among its technologies. The thrusters are actually on the InSight lander itself, but there are cutouts in the shell so the relevant rockets can vent into space.

The final course correction was 25 November 2018, the day before its touch down. A few hours before making contact with the Martian atmosphere, the cruise stage was jettisoned, on 26 November 2018.

=== Entry, descent, and landing ===
On 26 November 2018, at approximately 19:53 UTC, mission controllers received a signal via the Mars Cube One (MarCO) satellites that the spacecraft had successfully touched down at Elysium Planitia. After landing, the mission took three months to deploy and commission the geophysical science instruments. It then began its mission of observing Mars, which was planned to last for two years.

The spacecraft's mass that entered the atmosphere of Mars was 1,340 lb (608 kg). There were three major stages to InSight's landing:

- Entry: after separating from the cruise stage the aeroshell enters the atmosphere and is subject to air and dust in the Martian atmosphere.
- Parachute descent: at a certain speed and altitude a parachute is deployed to slow the lander further.
- Rocket descent: closer to the ground the parachute is ejected and the lander uses rocket engines to slow the lander before touchdown.

Landing sequence:

- 25 November 2018, final course correction before EDL.
- 26 November 2018, Cruise stage jettisoned before entering the atmosphere.
- Several minutes later, the aeroshell containing the lander makes contact with the upper Martian atmosphere at 12,300 mph (19,800 km/h).
  - At this point it is 80 miles (130 km) above Mars and in the next few minutes it lands, but undergoes many stages.
- Aeroshell is heated to 1,500 °C (2,730 °F) during descent.
- At 385 m/s (1,260 ft/s) and ~11,100 m (36,400 ft) above the surface, the parachute is deployed.
- Several seconds later, the heat shield is jettisoned from the lander.
- The landing legs extended.
- Landing radar activated.
- Backshell jettisoned at a speed of about 60 m/s (200 ft/s) and at 1,100 m (3,600 ft) altitude.
- Landing rockets turned on.
- Roughly 50 m (160 ft) from the ground constant velocity mode is entered.
- Approaches ground at about 5 mph (8.0 km/h).
- Touchdown—each of the three lander legs have a sensor to detect ground contact.
- Descent rockets are turned off at touchdown.
- Begin surface operations.

The lander's mass is about 358 kg (789 lb) but on Mars, which has 0.376 of Earth's gravity, it only weighs the equivalent of a 135 kg (298 lb) object on Earth.

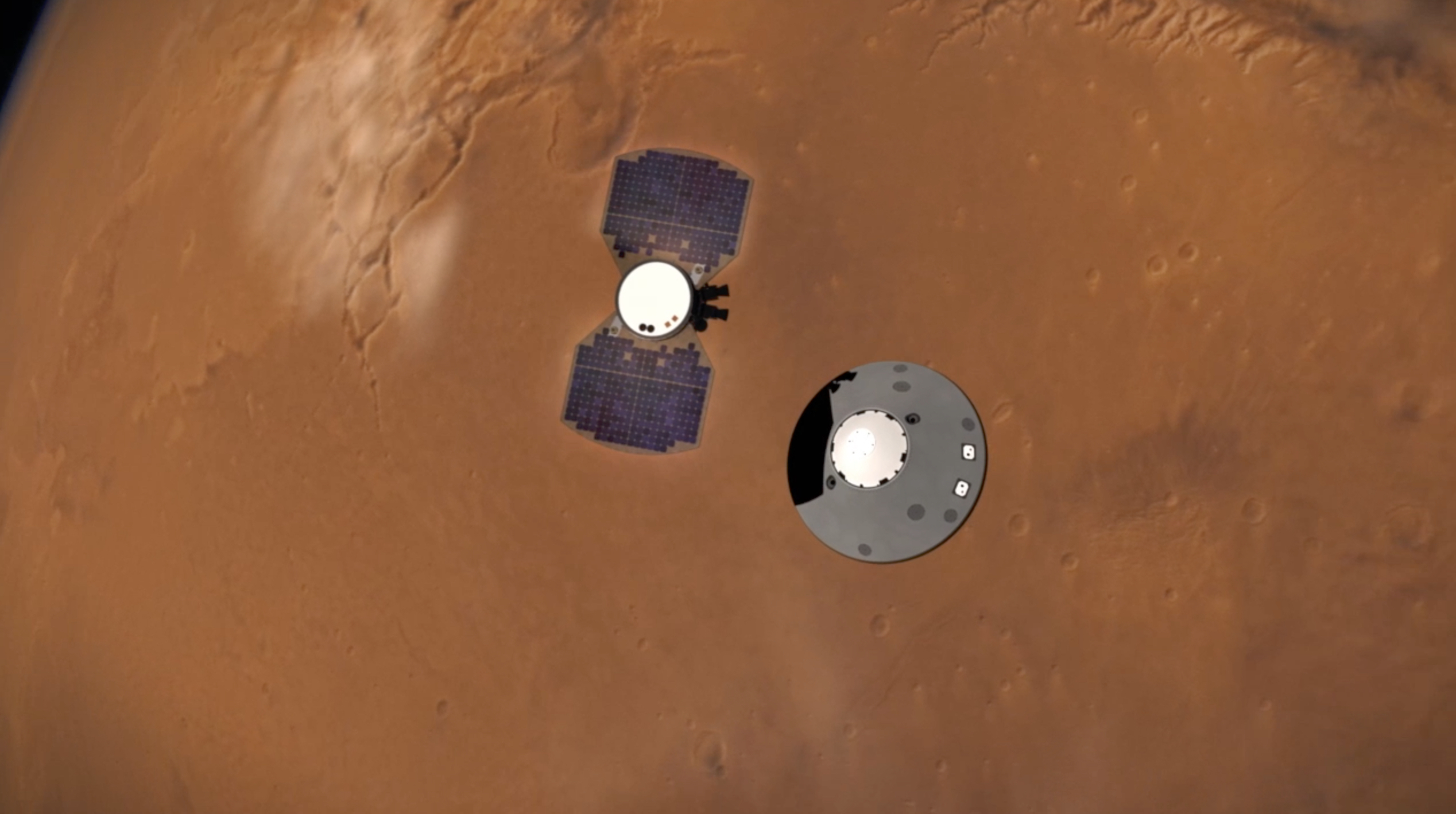
Illustration of the InSight cruise stage and lander separating prior to landing

Touchdown on Elysium Planitia (animation)

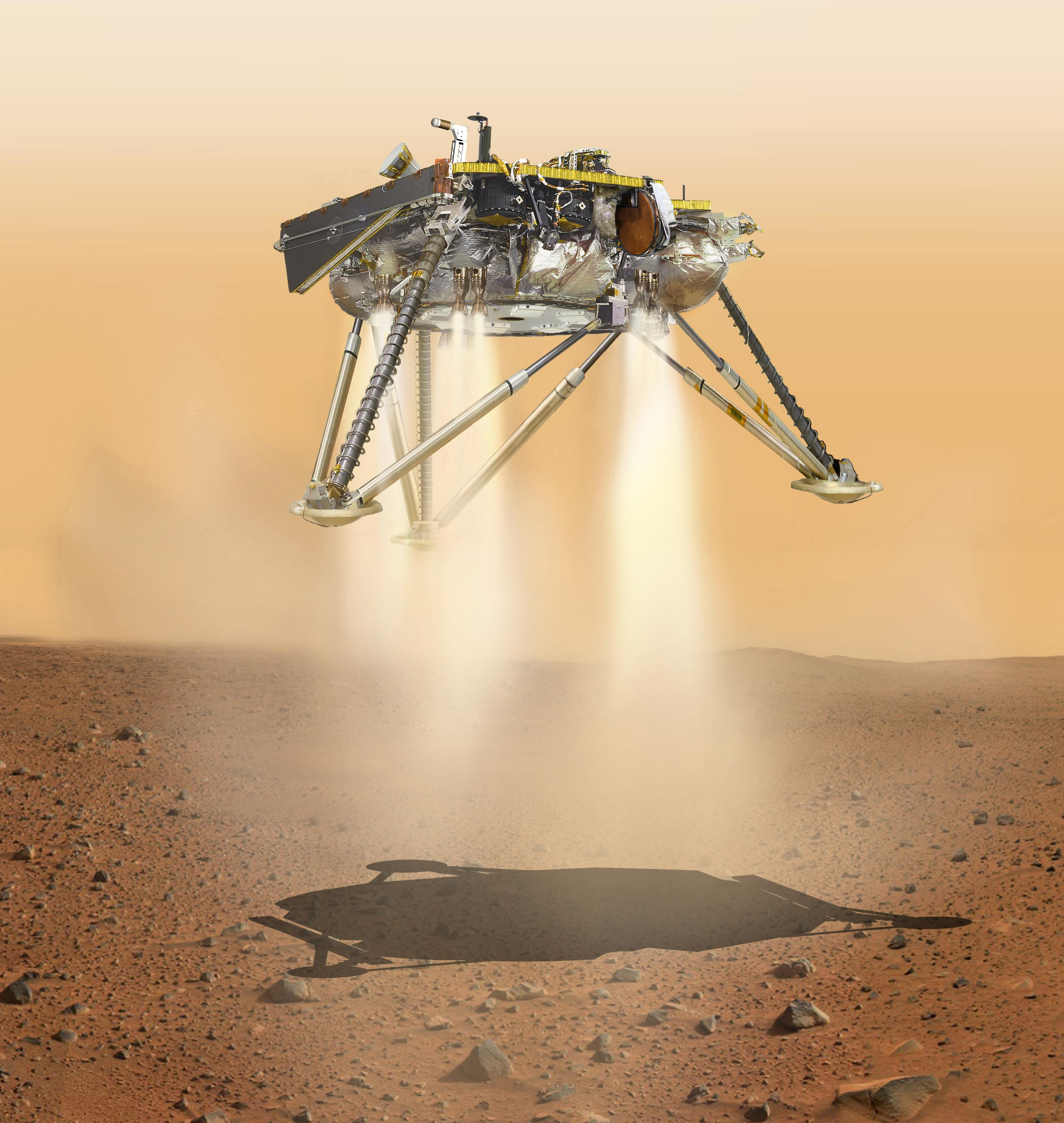
A simulated view of NASA's InSight lander about to land on the surface of Mars

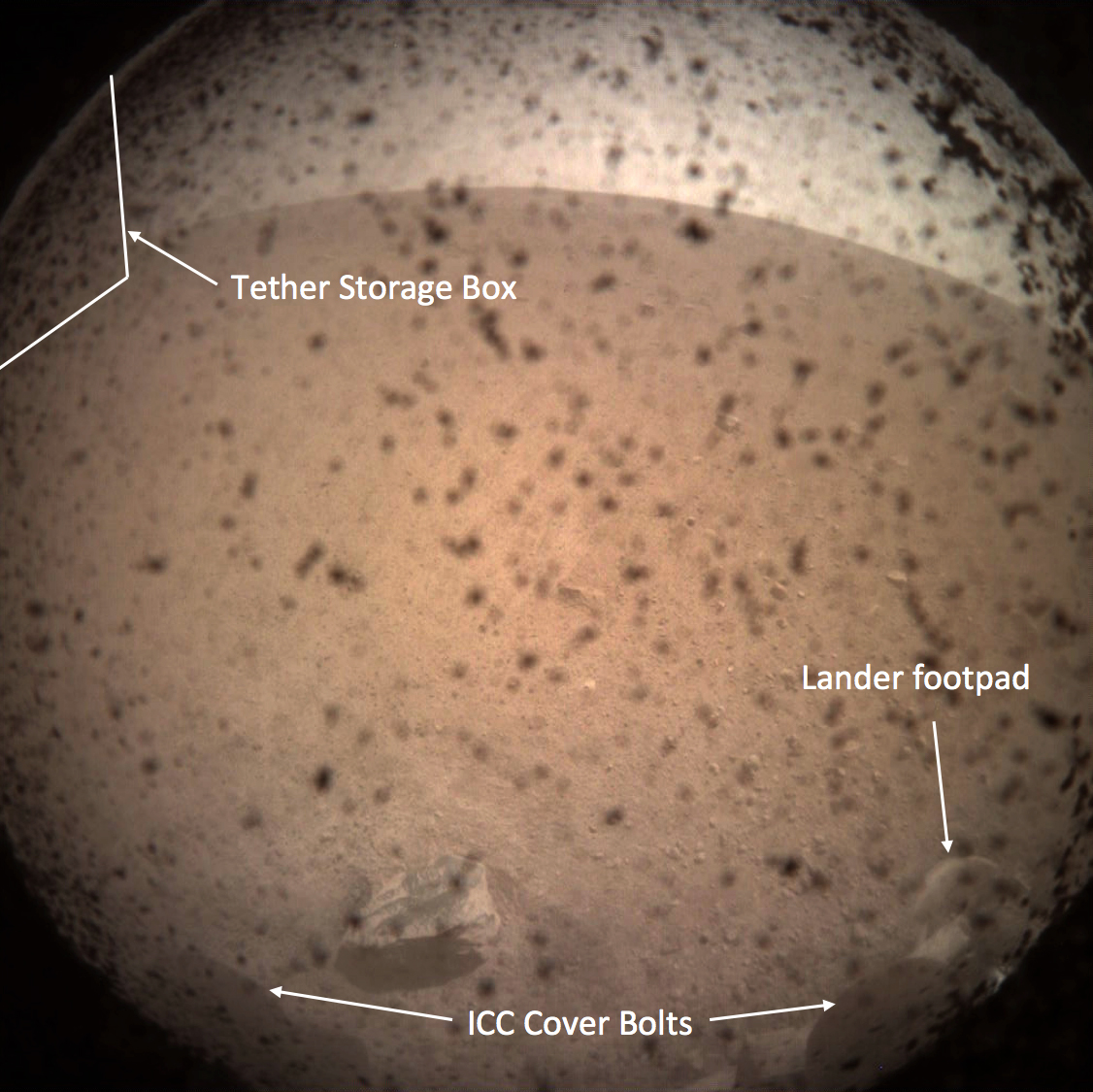
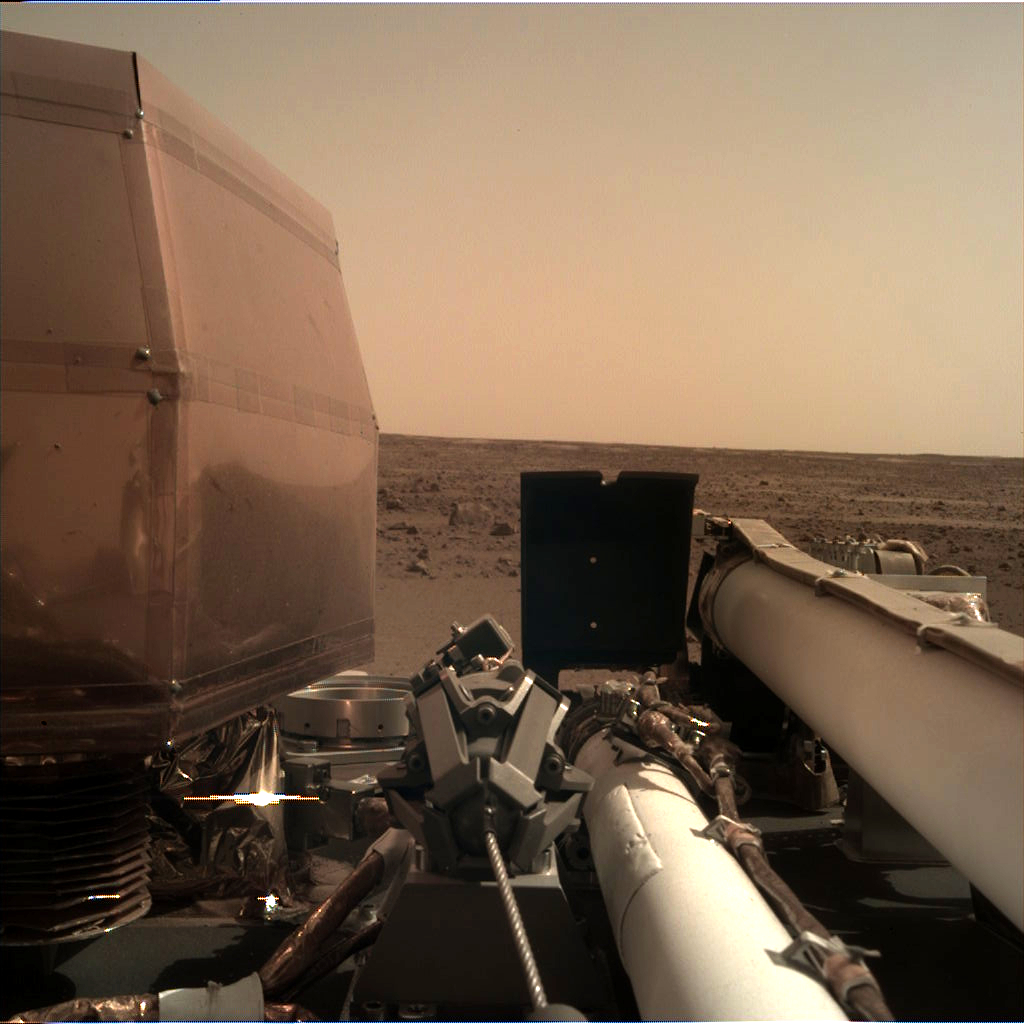
First light on the surface of Mars from the Instrument Context Camera (ICC, left) and the Instrument Deployment Camera (IDC, right)
26 November 2018 (Touch down-day // Sol 0)
After InSight landing (14 December 2018)

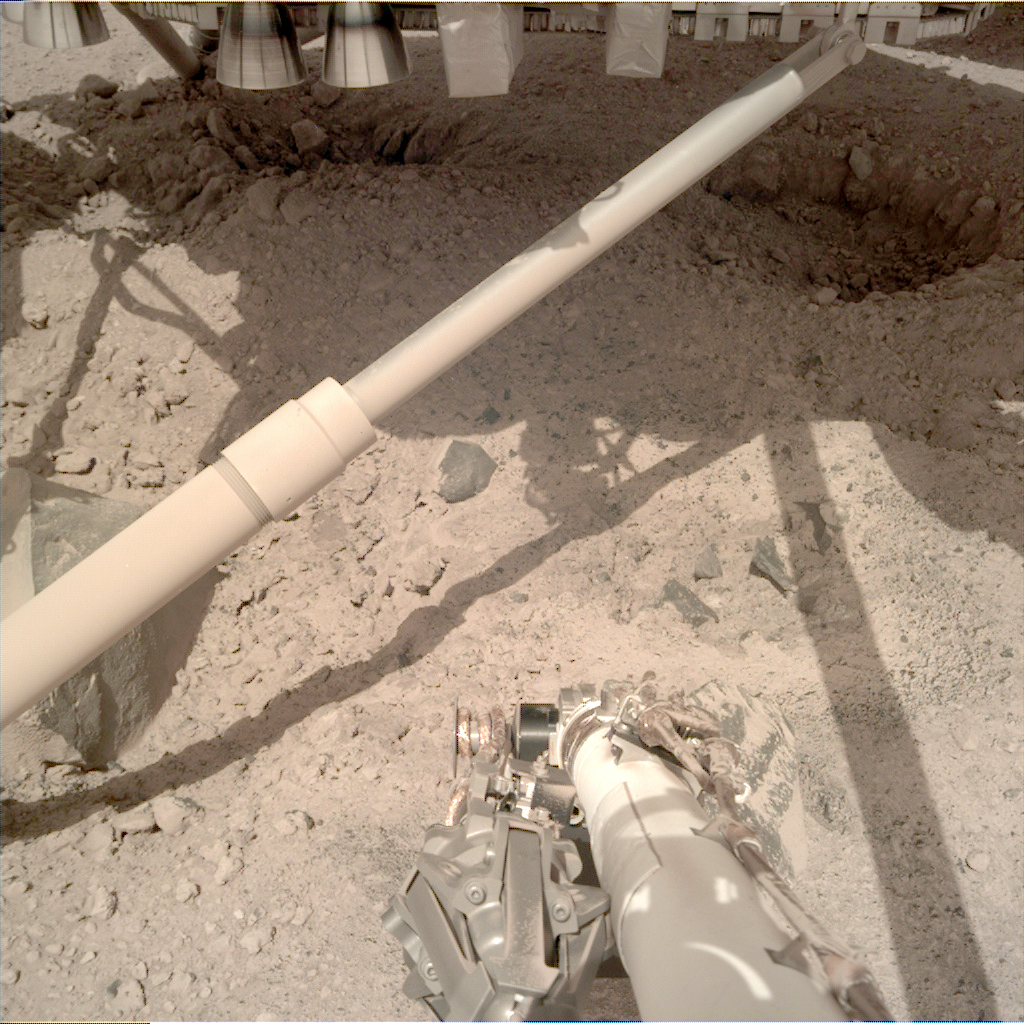
The pits made by thrusters (contrast-enhanced without color-correction)

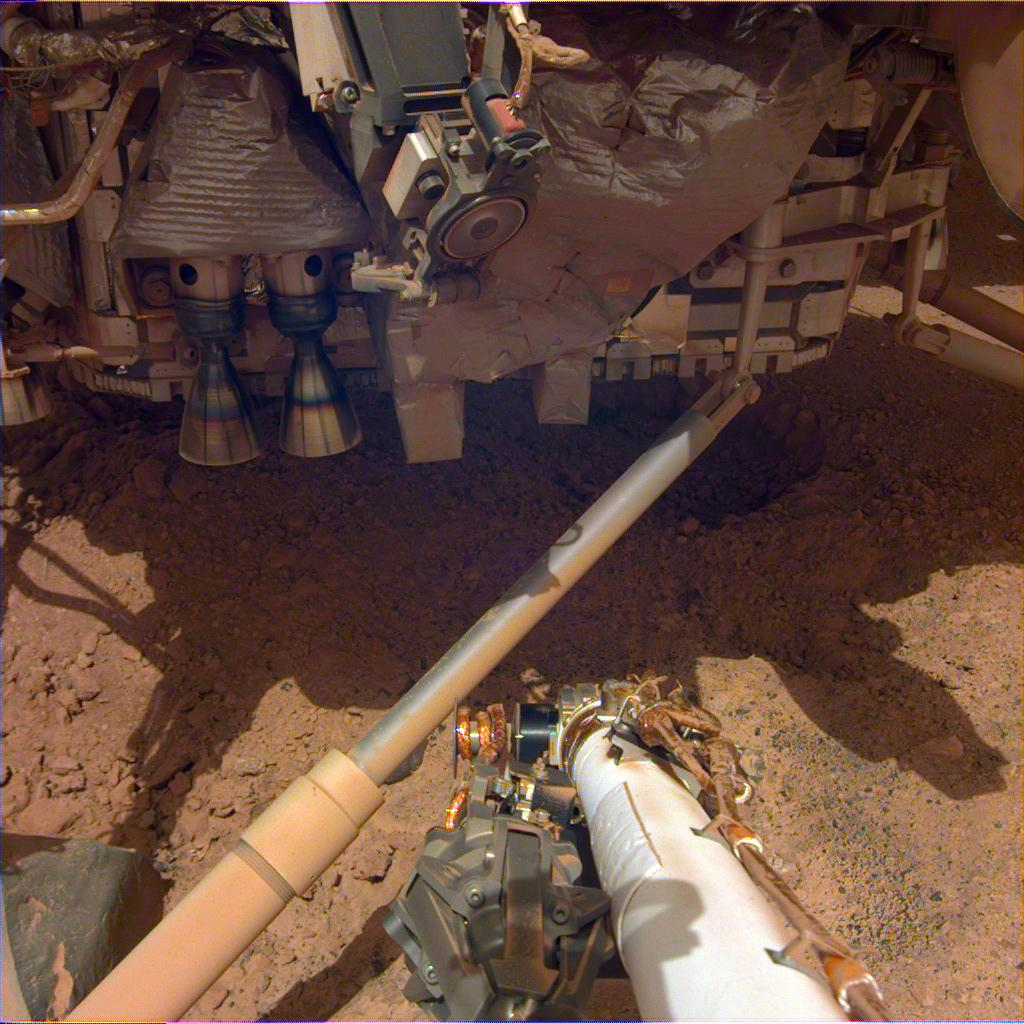
The soil churned by thrusters

On 26 November 2018, InSight successfully touched down in Elysium Planitia.

A few hours after landing, NASA's 2001 Mars Odyssey orbiter relayed signals indicating that InSight's solar panels had successfully unfurled and are generating enough electrical power to recharge its batteries daily. Odyssey also relayed a pair of images showing InSight's landing site. More images were acquired in stereo pairs to create 3D images, allowing InSight to find the best locations on the surface to place the heat probe and seismometer. Over the next few weeks, InSight checked health indicators and monitor both weather and temperature conditions at the landing site.

=== Landing site ===
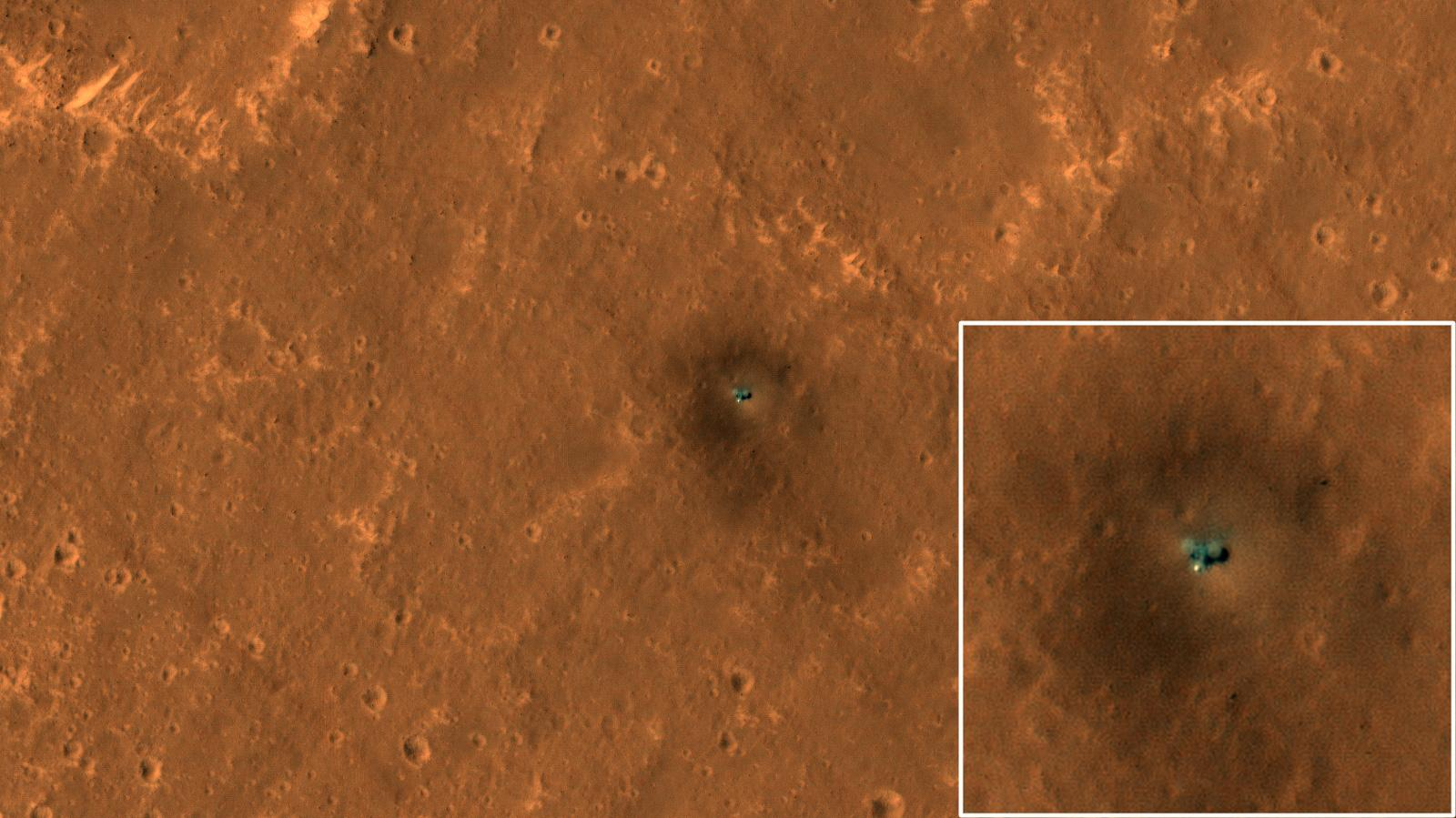
The InSight Lander as viewed from the MRO (23 September 2019)

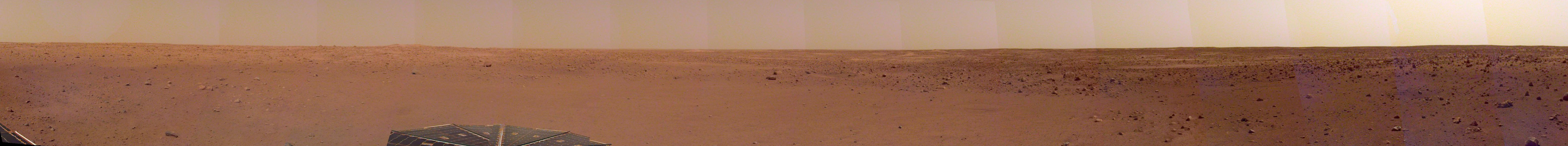
InSight Lander – panorama (9 December 2018)

Views from the Mars InSight lander (animated)

Sunrise (April 2022)

Clouds (April 2019)

Sunset (April 2022)

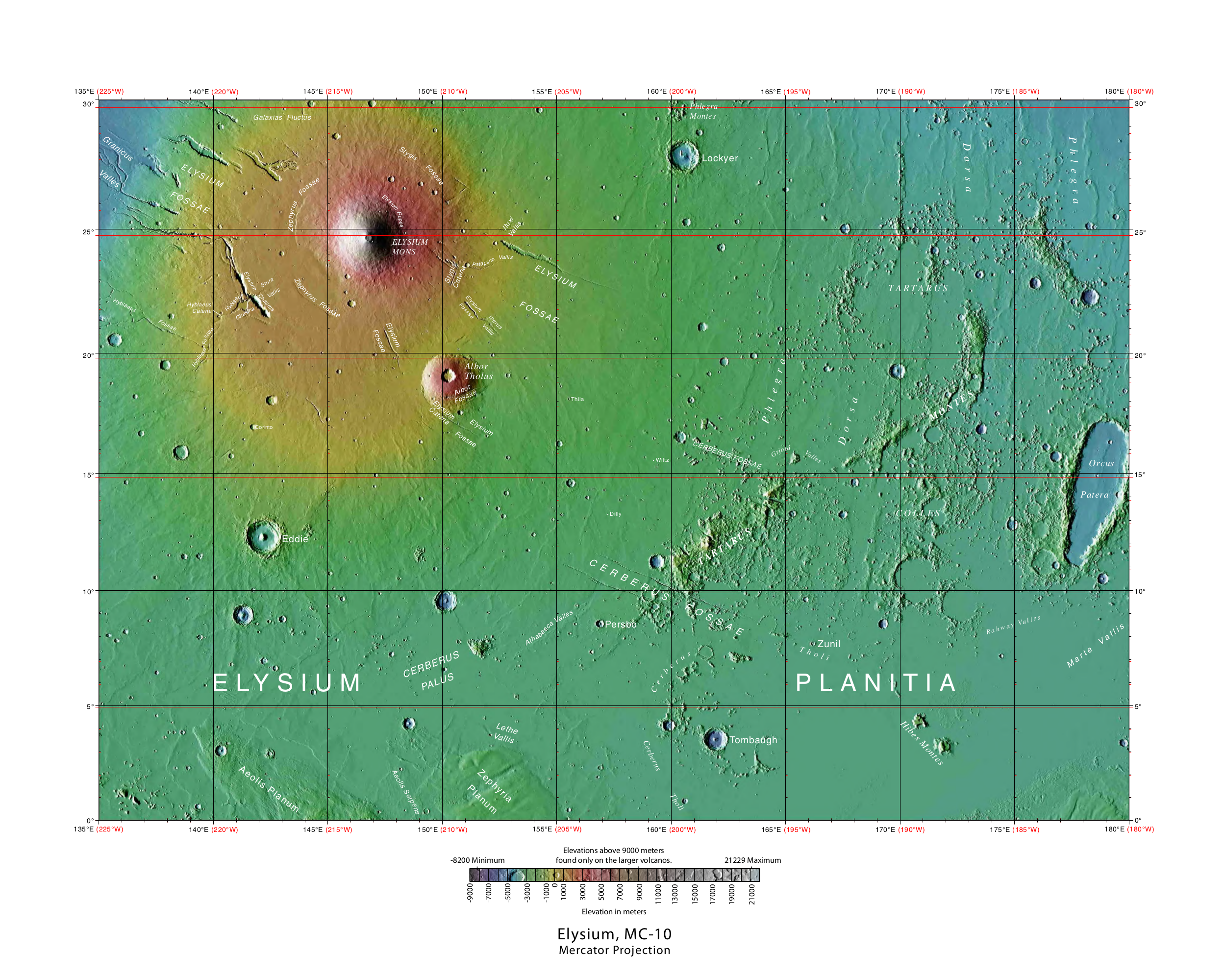
InSight landing zone is in the south and west of this grid, near 4.5° North and 136° East, this is south and to the west of Elysium Mons and Eddie crater.

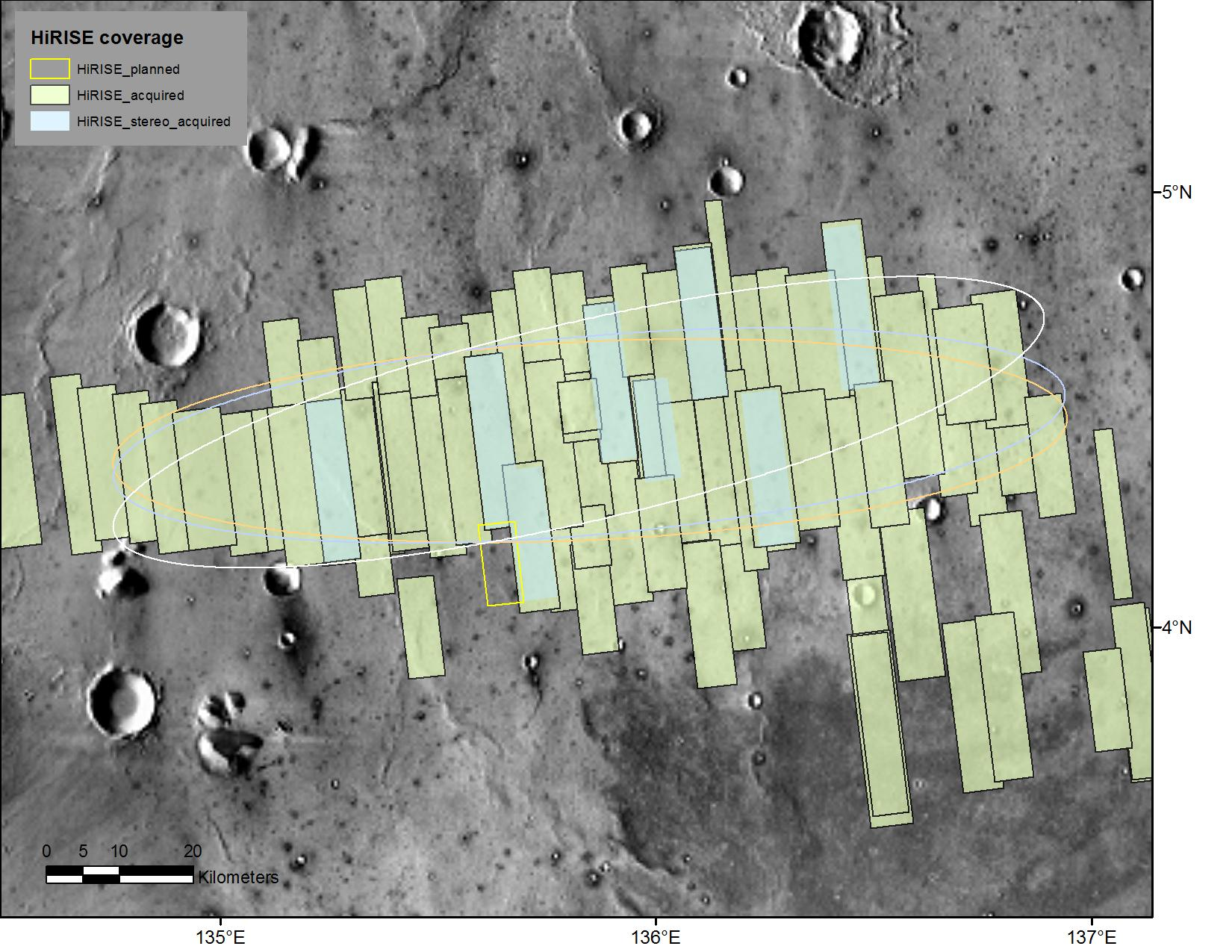
The image footprints by HiRise on Mars Reconnaissance Orbiter for studying the planned Insight landing ellipse. From east to west the scale is about 160 km (100 mi).

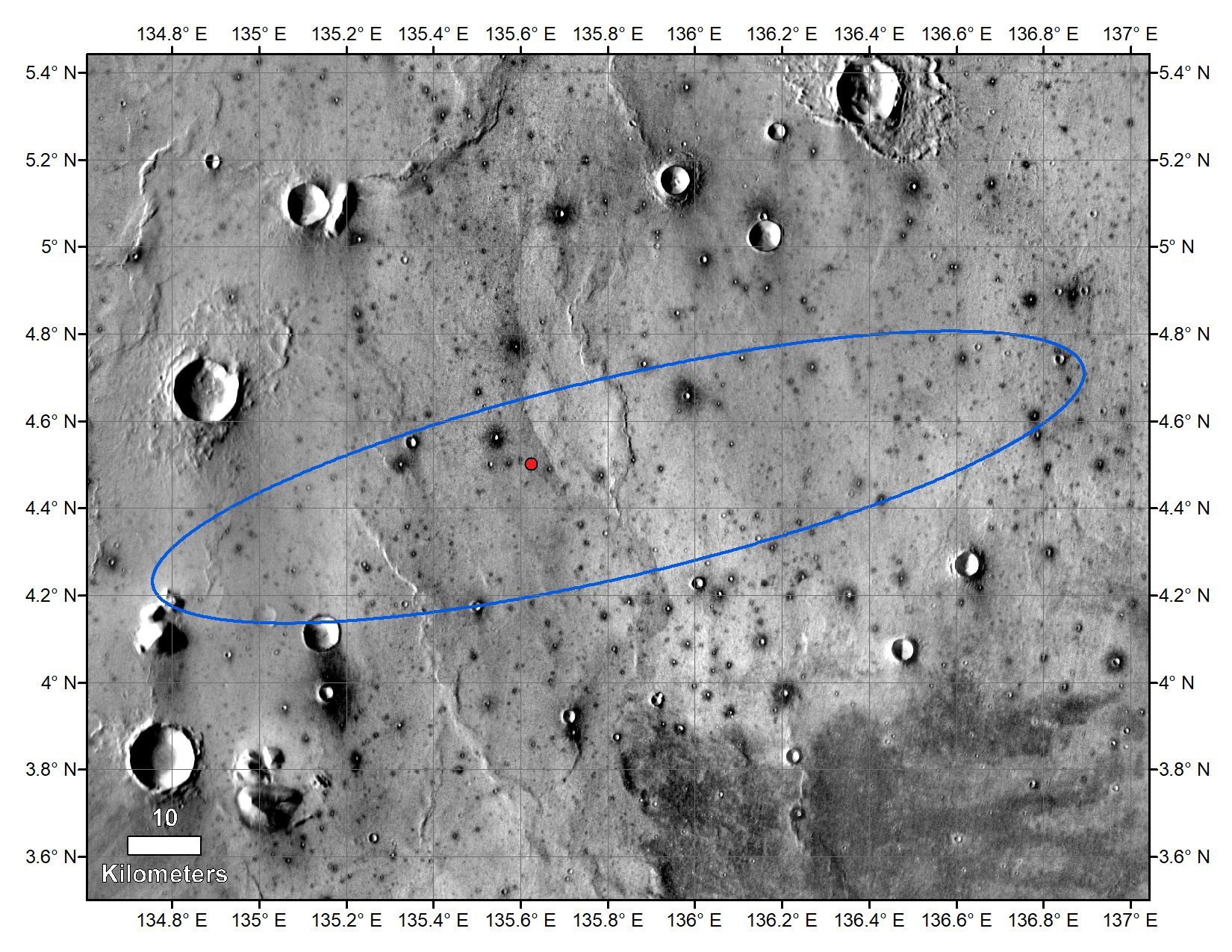
InSight final landing location (red dot)
(13 December 2018)

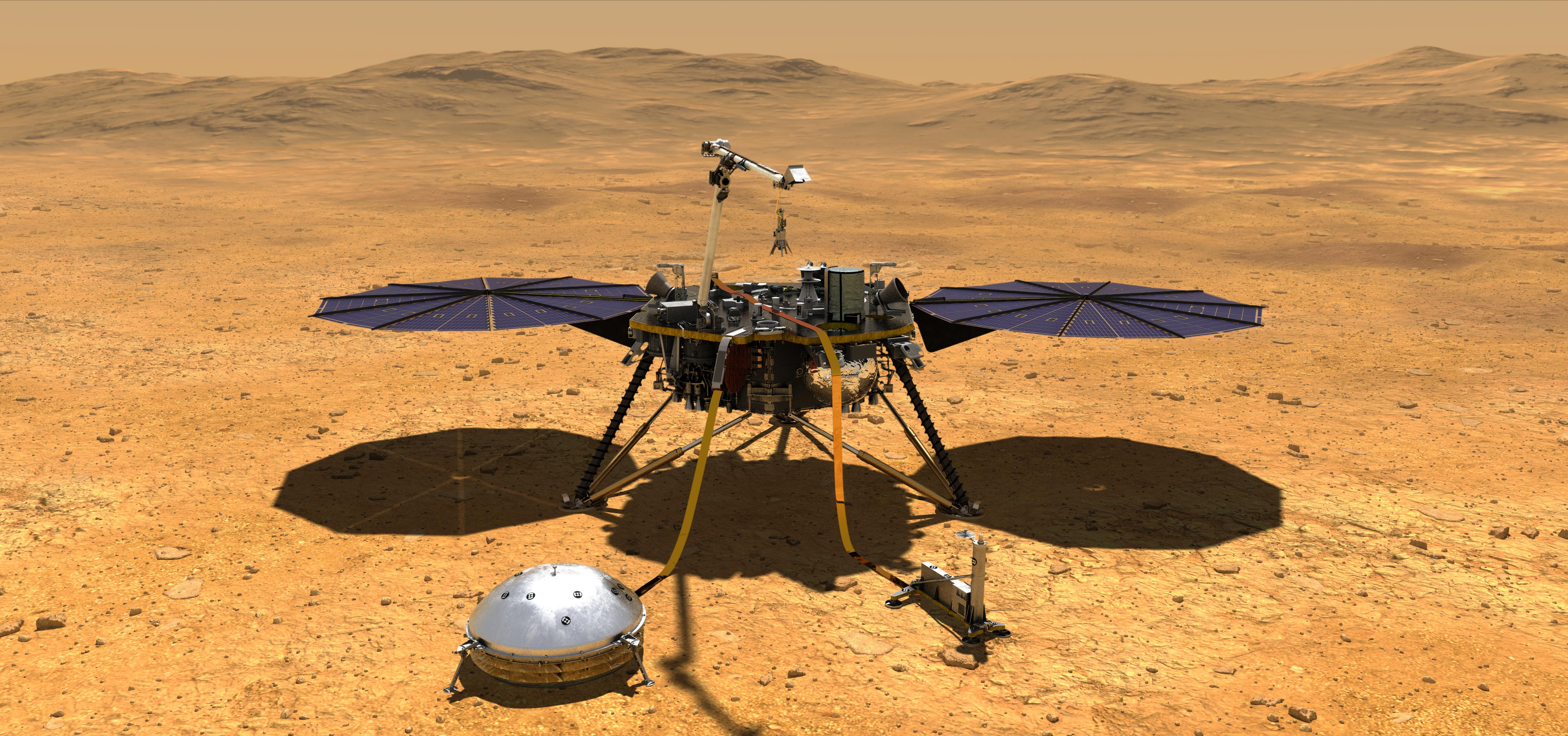
An artist's concept depicts NASA's InSight lander after it has deployed its instruments on the Martian surface

The NASA's InSight spacecraft unlatched its robotic arm on 27 November 2018, the day after it landed on Mars.

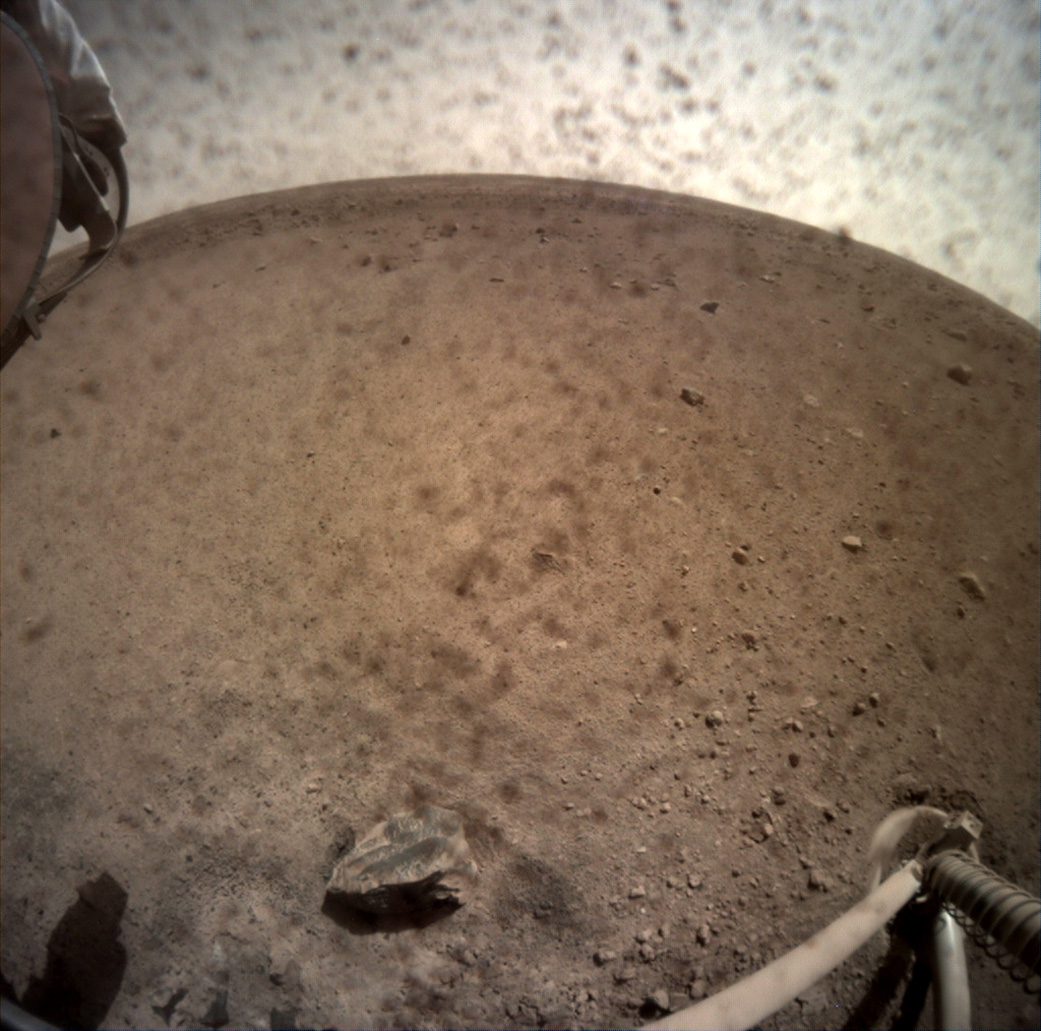
InSight on Mars − clear view (open lens cover) of landing area (ICC; 30 November 2018)

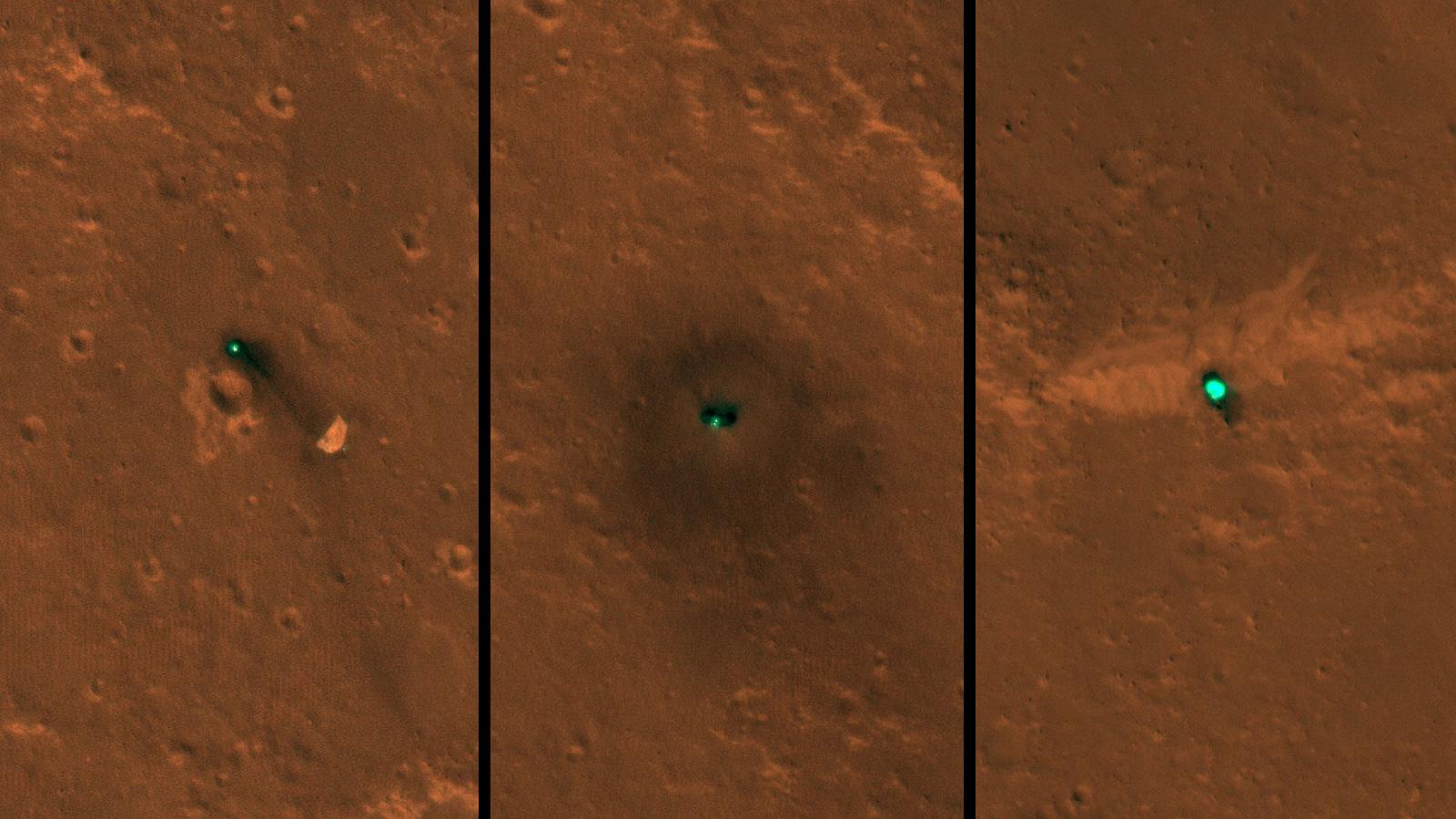
InSight parachute, lander, shield (11 December 2018)

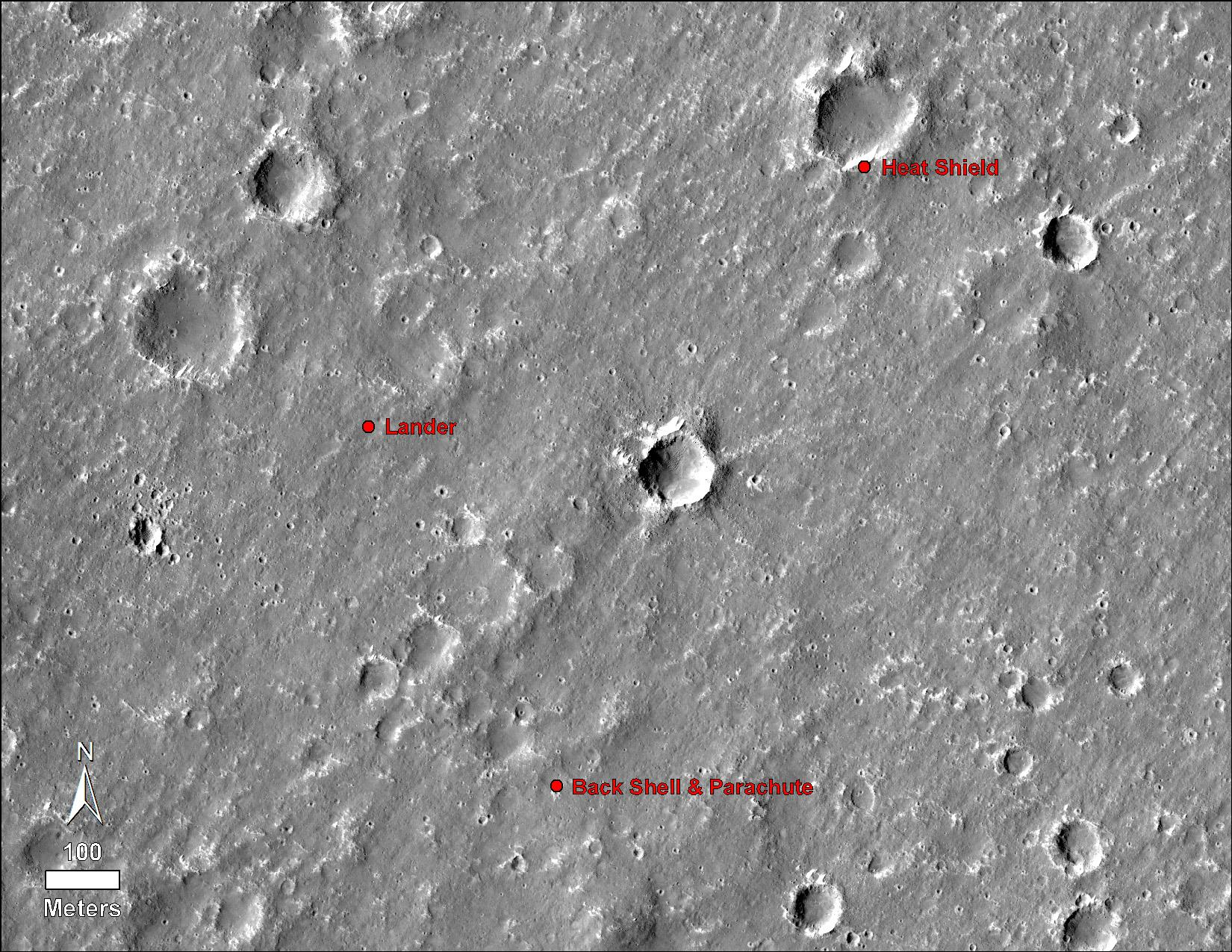
InSight parachute, lander, shield (26 November 2018)

As InSight's science goals are not related to any particular surface feature of Mars, potential landing sites were chosen on the basis of practicality. Candidate sites needed to be near the equator of Mars to provide sufficient sunlight for the solar panels year round, have a low elevation to allow for sufficient atmospheric braking during EDL, be flat and relatively rock-free to reduce the probability of complications during landing, and have soft enough terrain to allow the heat flow probe to penetrate well into the ground.

An optimal area that meets all these requirements is Elysium Planitia, so all 22 initial potential landing sites were located in this area. The only two other areas on the equator and at low elevation, Isidis Planitia and Valles Marineris, are too rocky. In addition, Valles Marineris has too steep a gradient to allow safe landing.

In September 2013, the initial 22 potential landing sites were narrowed down to four, and the Mars Reconnaissance Orbiter was then used to gain more information on each of the four potential sites before a final decision was made. Each site consists of a landing ellipse that measures about 130 by 27 km (81 by 17 mi).

In March 2017, scientists from the Jet Propulsion Laboratory announced that the landing site had been selected. It is located in western Elysium Planitia at 4.5°N 135.9°E. The landing site is about 600 km (370 mi) north from where the Curiosity rover is operating in Gale Crater.

On 26 November 2018, the spacecraft successfully touched down at its landing site, and in early December 2018 InSight lander and EDL components were imaged from space on the surface of Mars. The images provided precise position of the lander: 4.5024°N 135.6234°E.

Mars InSight Lander – Self-portraits

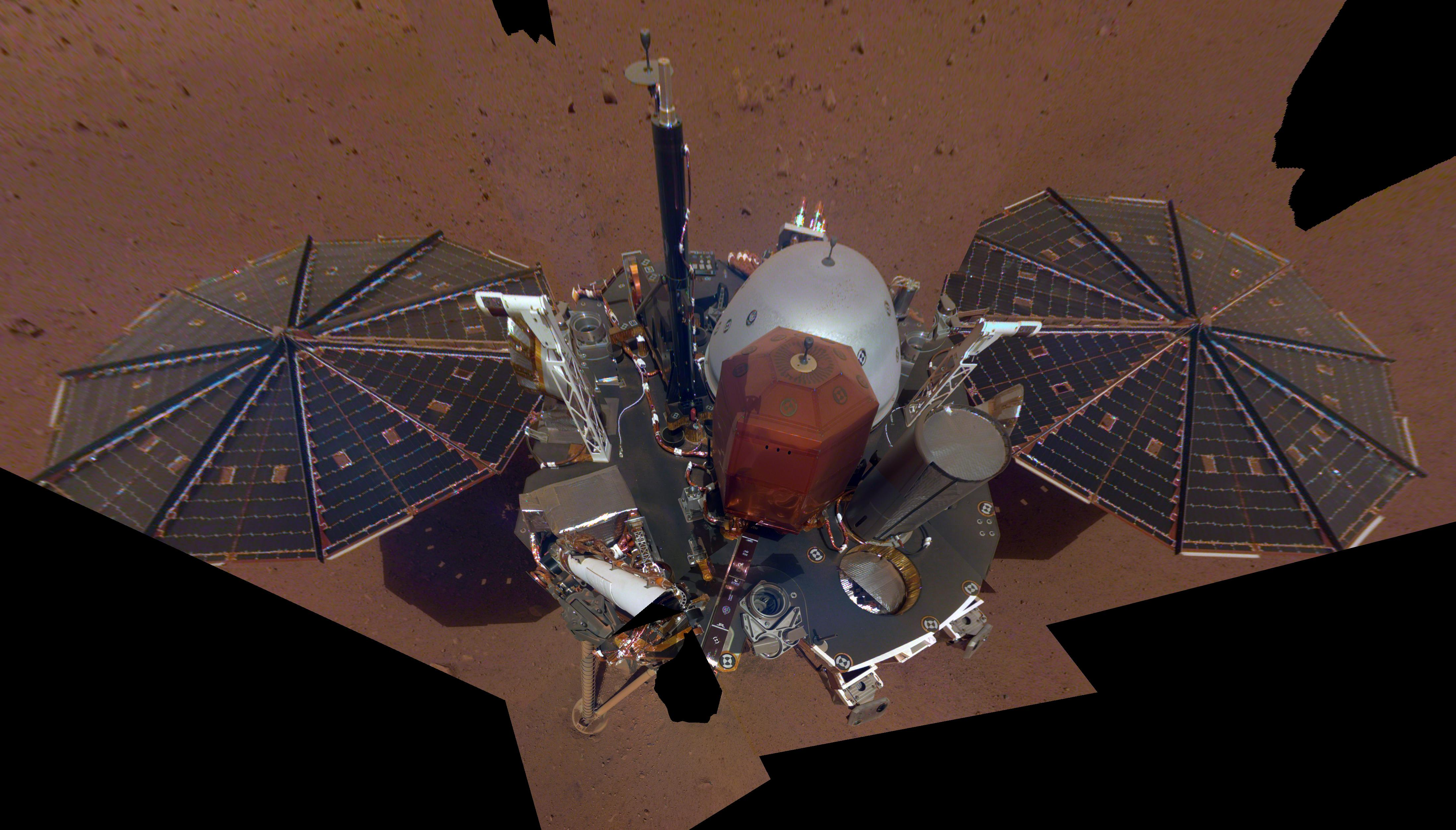
First (11 December 2018)

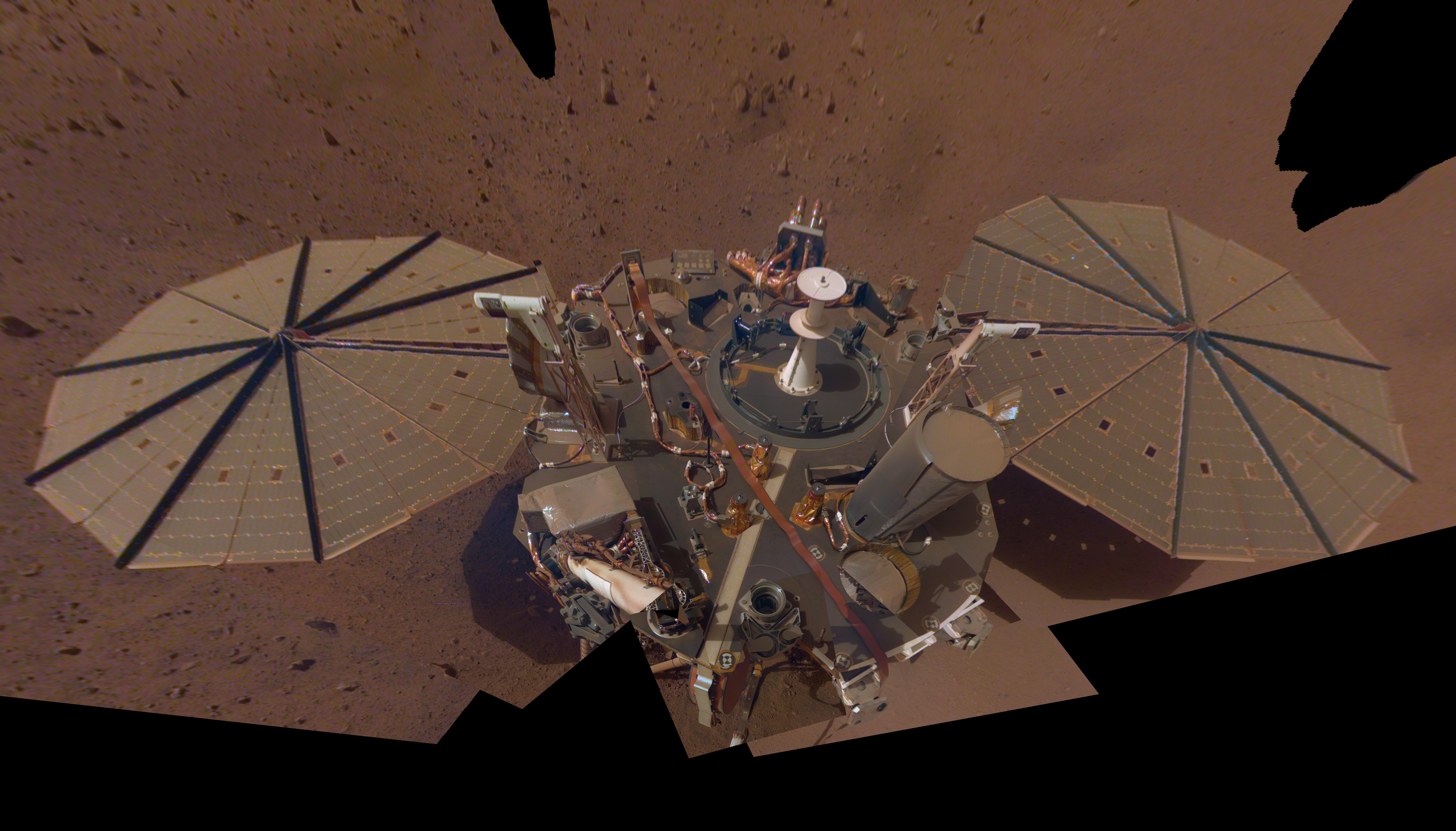
Second (11 April 2019)

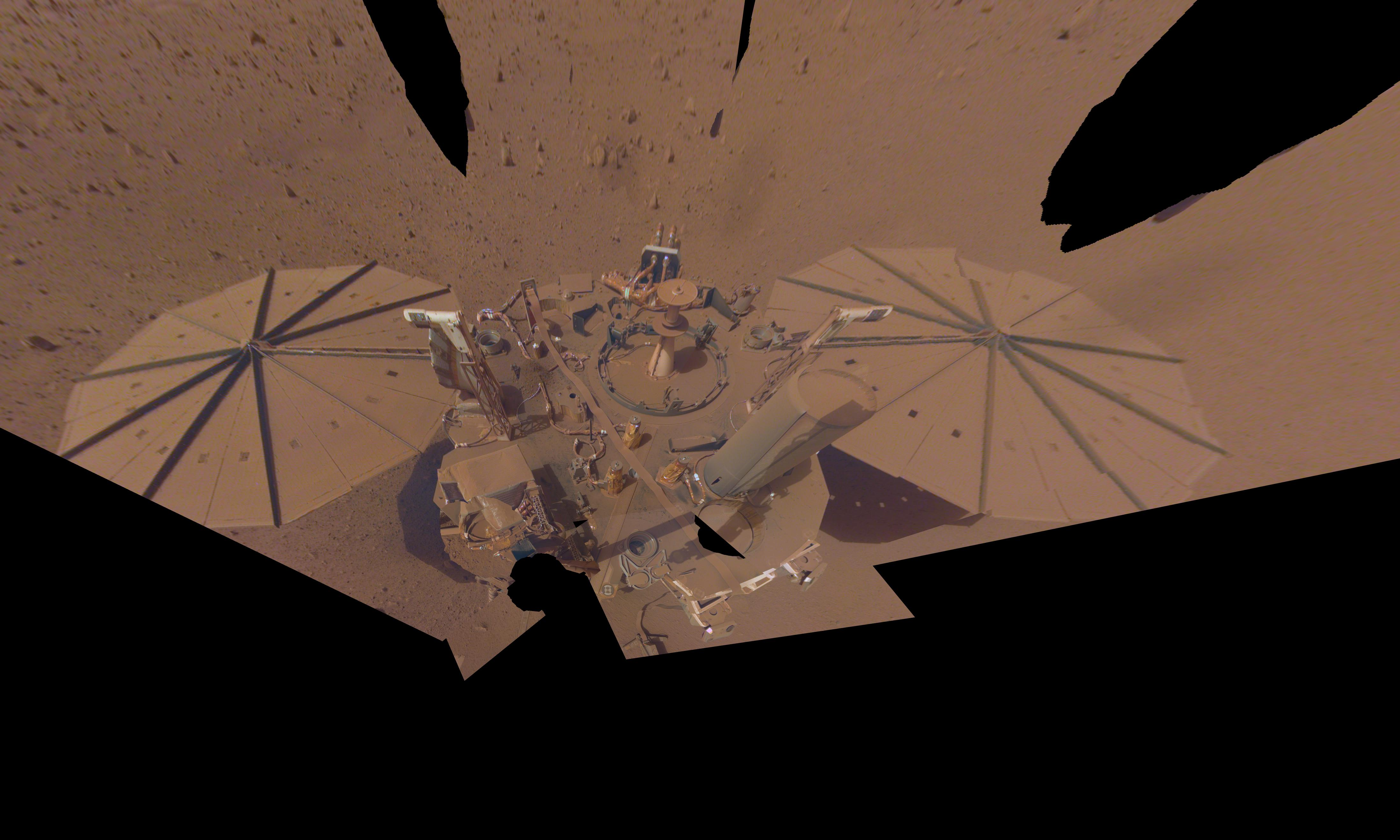
Third (24 April 2022)

Before/After 1223 days of dust

== Surface operations ==
On 26 November 2018, NASA reported that the InSight lander had landed successfully on Mars. The meteorological suite (TWINS) and magnetometer were operational, and the mission took approximately three months to deploy and commission the geophysical science instruments. After landing, the dust was allowed to settle for a few hours, during which time the solar array motors were warmed up and then the solar panels were unfurled. The lander then reported its systems' status, acquired some images, and powered down to sleep mode for its first night on Mars. On its first Martian day (known as a "sol") it set a new solar power record of 4.6 kilowatt-hours generated for a single sol. This amount is enough to support operations and deploy the sensors.

InSight on the surface of Mars (6 December 2018)

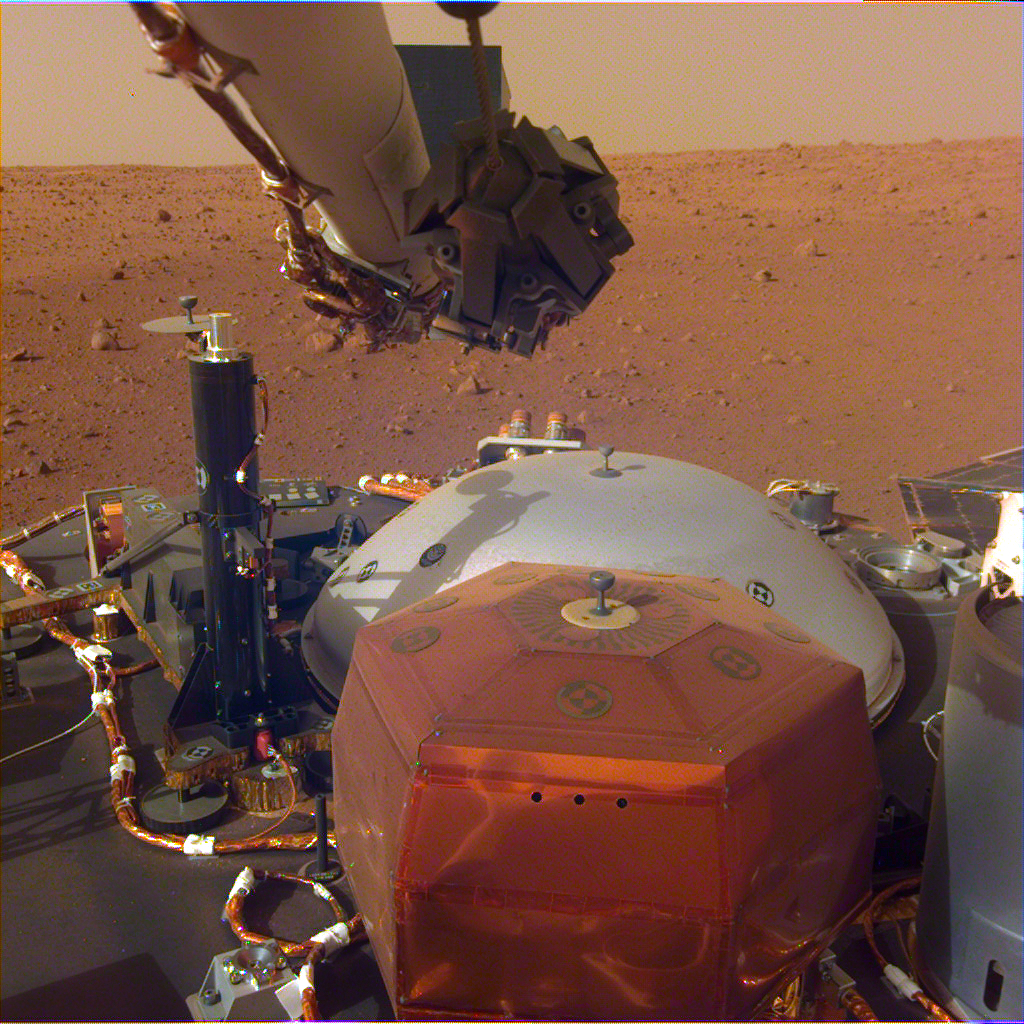
Deck and science instruments

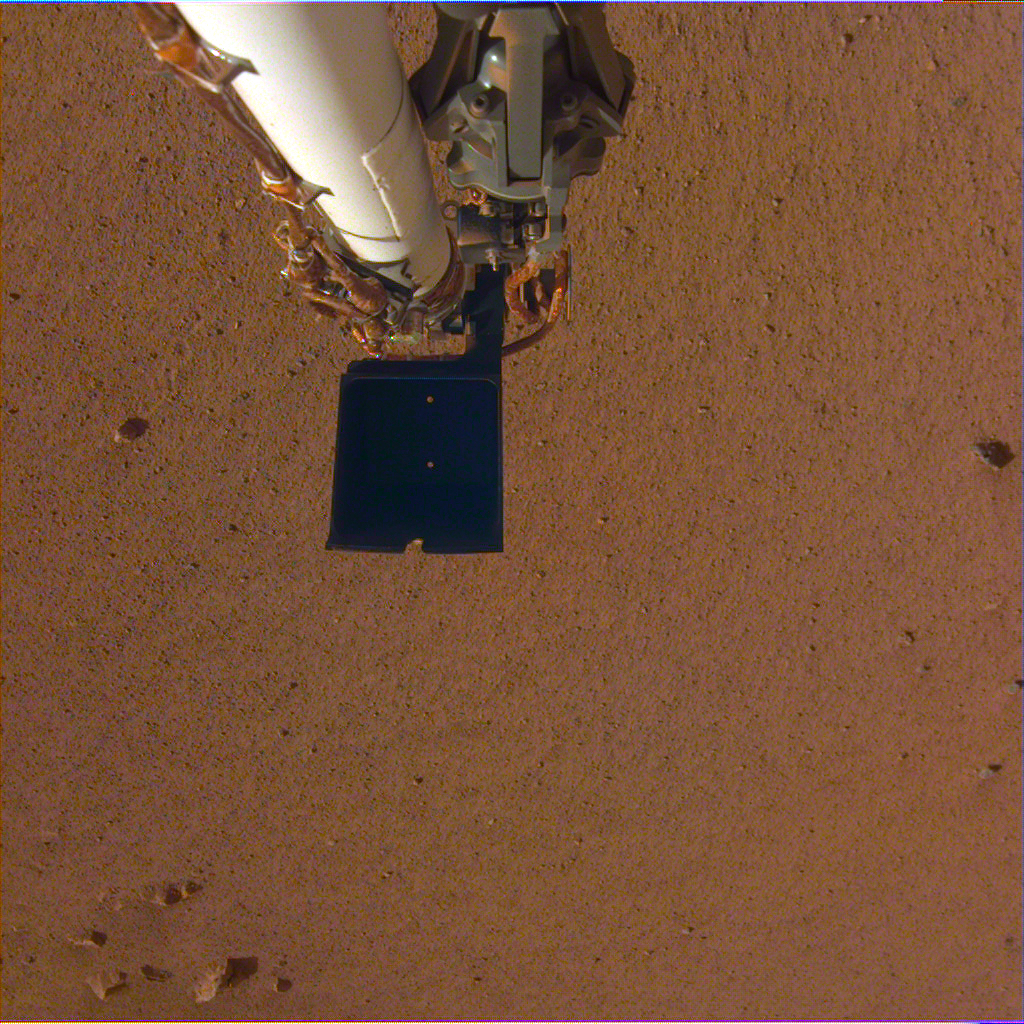
Robotic arm over Martian soil

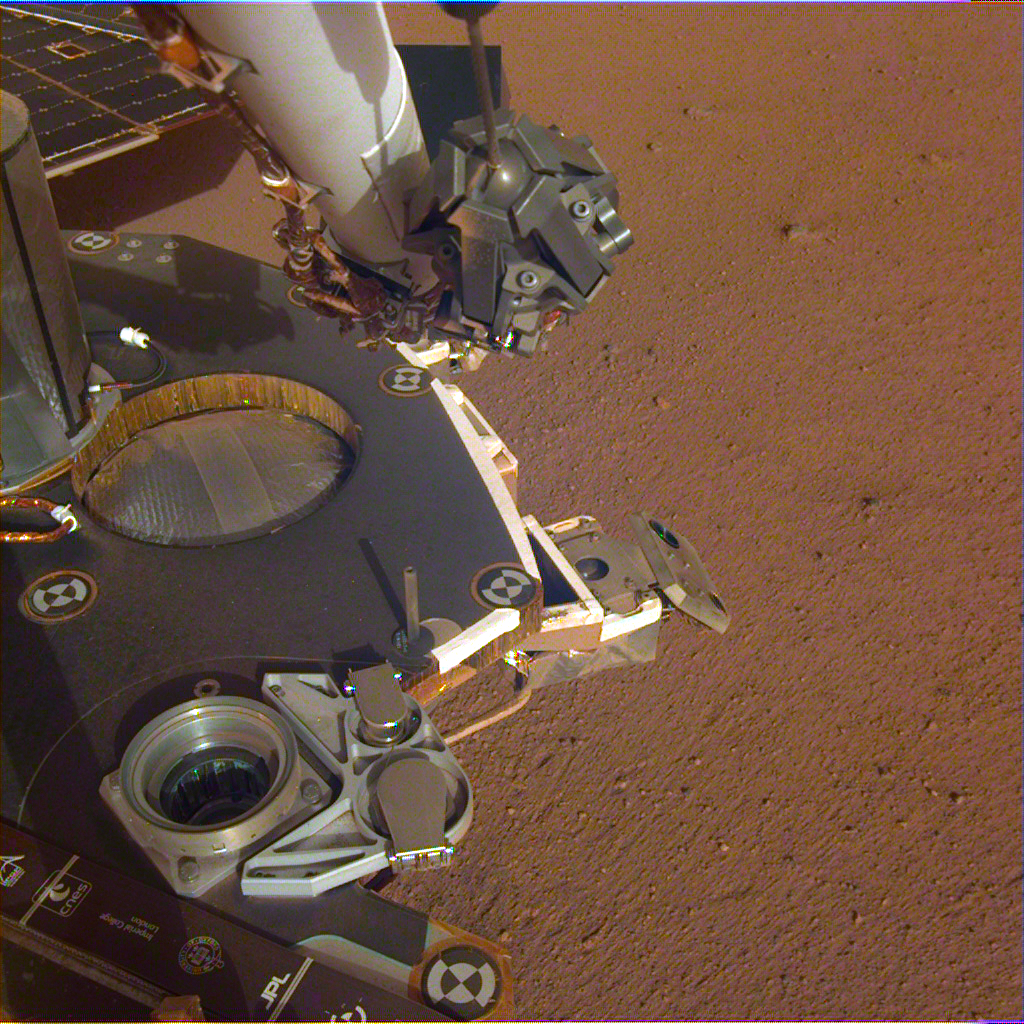
Robotic arm and deck

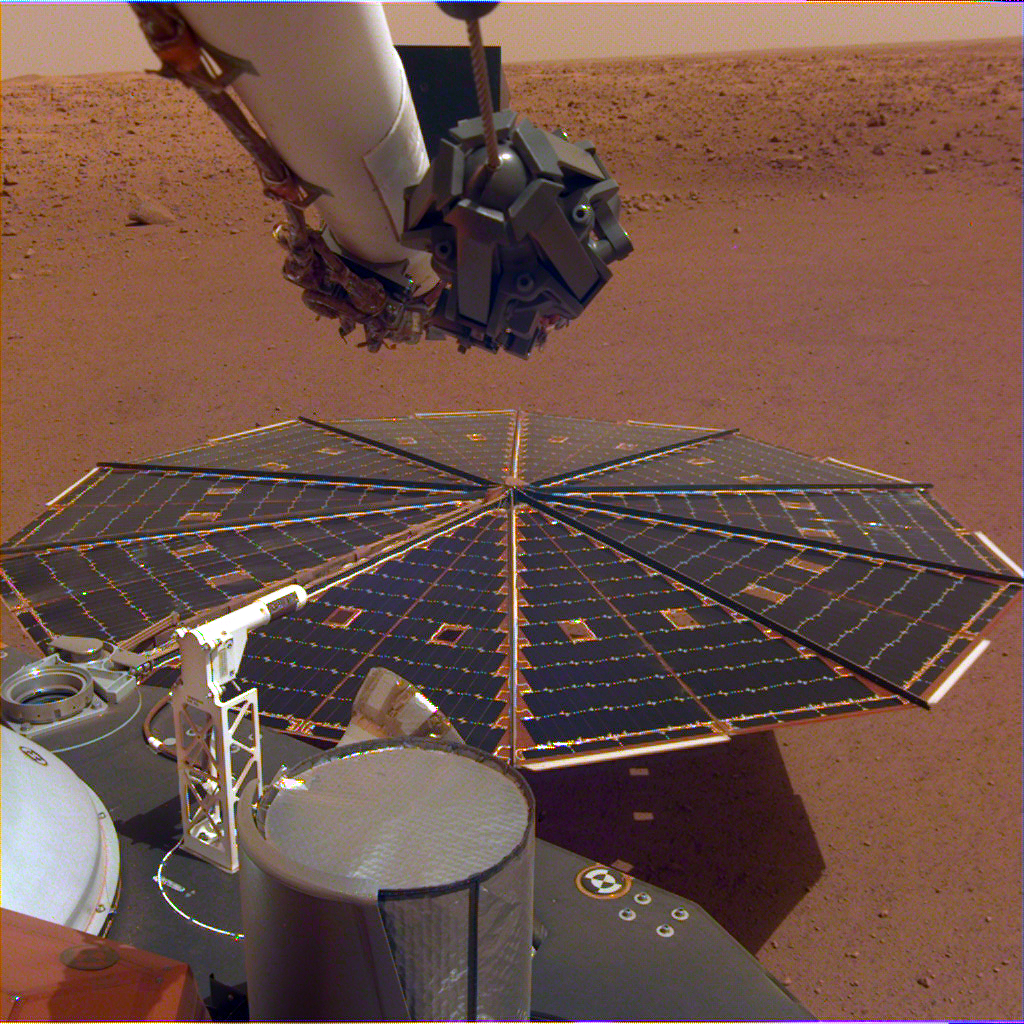
One of its two solar panels

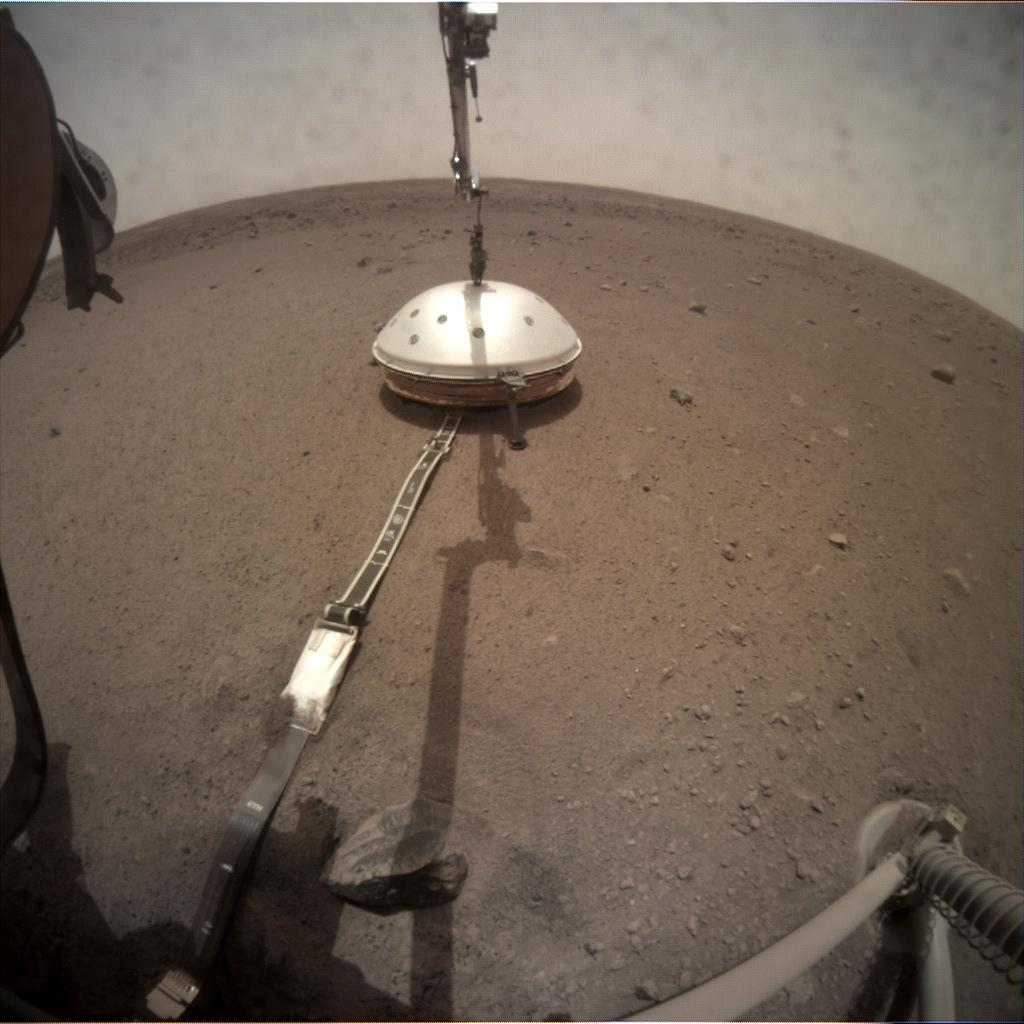
Deployment of wind and thermal shield

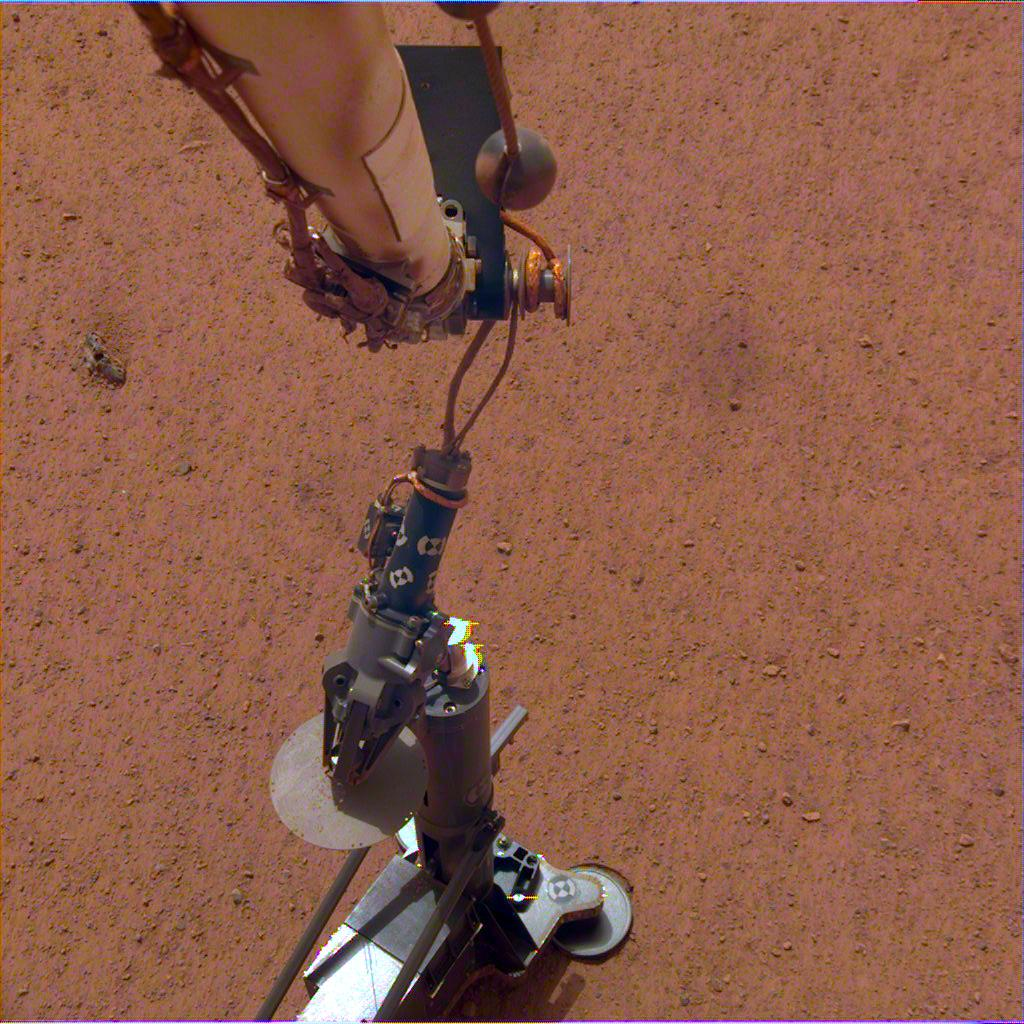
Deployment of heat probe (HP³)

InSight – seismometer deployed, first time onto the surface of another planet (19 December 2018)

The seismometer deployment animation from Instrument Context Camera

The seismometer deployment animation from Instrument Deployment Camera

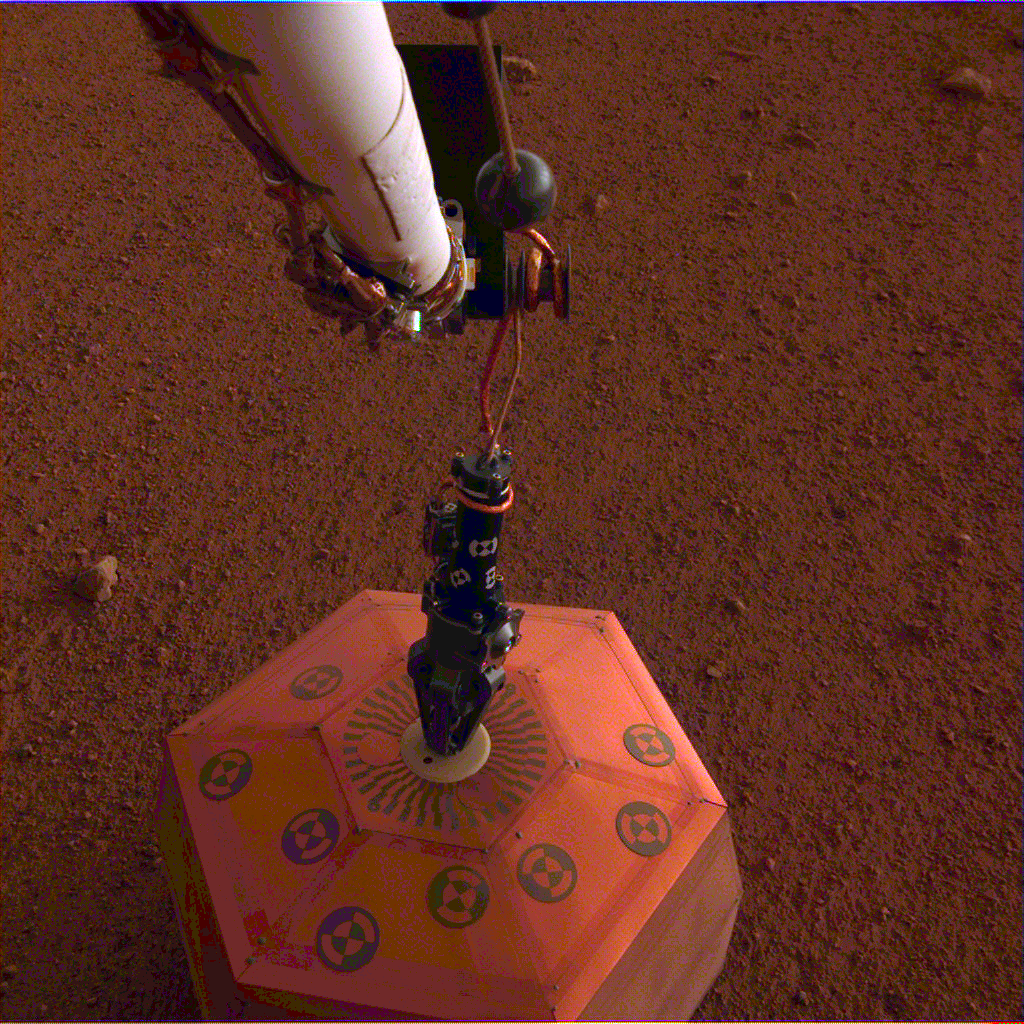
The seismometer deployed.

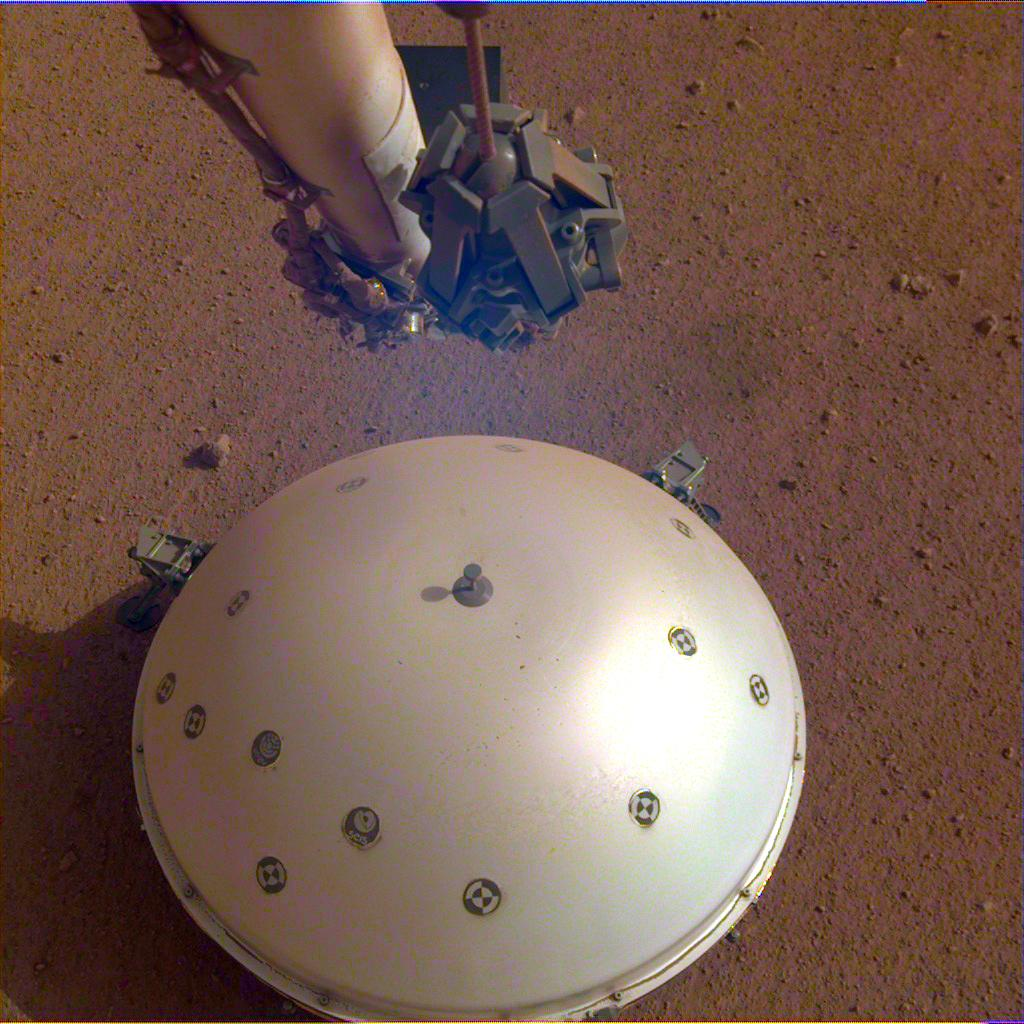
The wind and thermal shield deployed over seismometer (Sol 110)

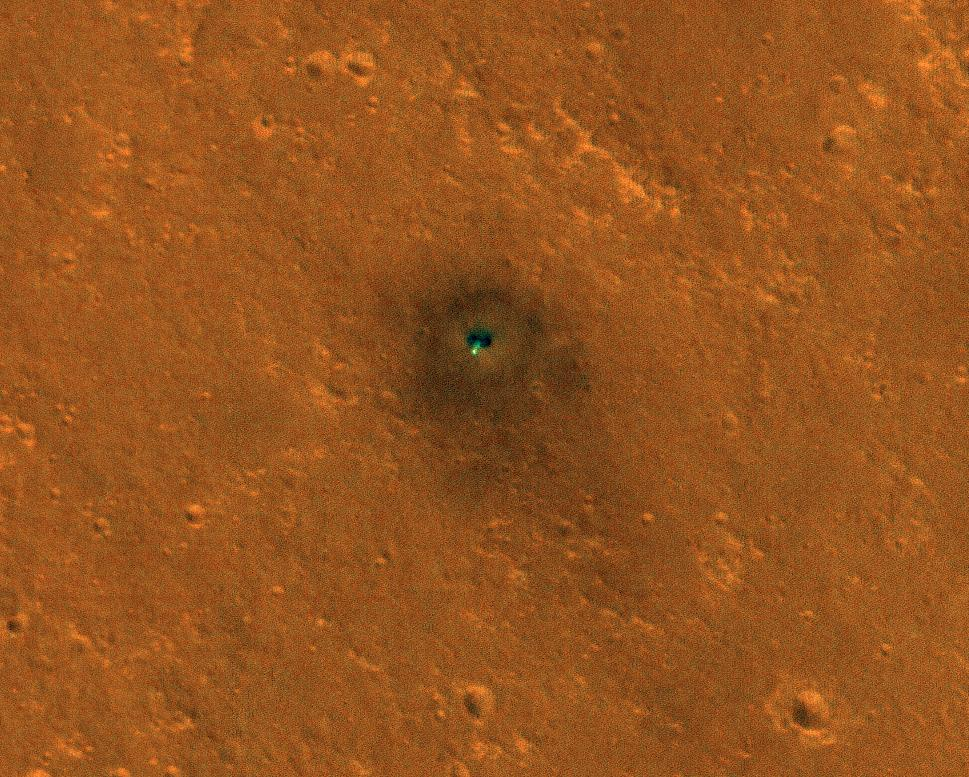
The lander (green) and shield (white dot) – viewed from space (4 February 2019)

On 7 December 2018, InSight recorded the sounds of Martian winds with SEIS, which is able to record vibrations within human hearing range, although rather low (i.e., subwoofer-type sounds), and these were sent back to Earth. This was the first time the sound of Mars wind was heard after two previous attempts.

On 19 December 2018, the SEIS instrument was deployed onto the surface of Mars next to the lander by its robotic arm, and it was commissioned on 4 February 2019. After the seismometer became fully operational, the heat probe instrument was deployed on 12 February 2019.

In April 2019, NASA reported that the Mars InSight lander detected its first marsquake.

Mars – InSight Lander – Seismic Event (AudioVideoFile; Sol 128; 6 April 2019)

In September 2019, researchers reported that InSight uncovered unexplained magnetic pulses, and magnetic oscillations.

On 24 February 2020, a summary of studies over the past year from InSight was presented which indicated that the planet Mars has active quakes, dust devils and magnetic pulses.

InSight's robotic arm cleans dust from the solar panel. (video; 0:08; 22 May 2021)

In February 2020, new data gathered from NASA's InSight lander showed that the Martian magnetic field at the landing site is about 10 times stronger than previously thought, and fluctuates rapidly.

In early 2021, the InSight team announced they would attempt to detect the arrival of the Mars 2020 mission using InSight's seismometers. Pre-landing modeling of the signals from Mars 2020's entry, descent and landing sequence suggested that the most probable source of any potential signal would be the impact of the spacecraft's cruise mass balance devices with the Martian surface, at speeds of around 4000 m/s. Shortly after successfully landing the Perseverance Rover, NASA announced that its landing went undetected by InSight. This helped demonstrate that Mars has a seismic efficiency of less than 3%.

On 12 April 2021, it was reported that Insight went into emergency hibernation because its solar panels were filled with Martian dust.

On 14 April, the lander began to transmit images after waking from hibernation.

On 3 May 2021, InSight used its robotic arm to trickle sand beside a solar panel. The InSight team wanted to let the sand blow away and touch the solar panels, sticking some dust particles to it, before leaving the solar panel. The sand trickle resulted in a boost in power of 30 watt-hours per sol.

In July 2021 three papers studying Mars's interior structure were published. Seismometer data confirms that the center of Mars is molten. The crust of Mars is thinner than expected and may have two or three sub-layers.

In January 2022, InSight went into safe mode due to a dust storm in the area, which reduced sunlight. During its time in safe mode, all but essential functions were suspended. It left safe mode on 19 January 2022 and resumed normal operations; however, all science instruments were left off in the meantime.

As of May 2022, Insight has recorded 1,313 marsquakes.

The seismometer (SEIS), radio experiment (RISE) and the weather instruments (TWINS) continue to operate as the lander's Mars surface mission was extended by two years, until end of December 2022. The mission was retired due to insufficient power generation on the solar panels, due to dust accumulation.

In August 2024, a reservoir of liquid water was discovered on Mars – deep in the rocky outer crust of the planet. The findings came from a new analysis of seismometer data, which recorded four years' of vibrations – Mars quakes – from deep inside the Red Planet.

A new study shows that ancient faults beneath Valles Marineris are still capable of producing marsquakes. This is direct seismic evidence of active faulting. For decades, scientists have wondered whether the faults associated with Valles Marineris are still active. Since Mars does not have moving tectonic plates, it is difficult to determine if its ancient fractures can still accommodate stress within the crust. Because of an unusual seismic event designated S0976a, recorded on August 25, 2021, by NASA’s InSight lander. Scientists were able to draw some conclusions. This event originated on the opposite side of Mars from InSight. It was the only recorded marsquake located in the planet’s western hemisphere. It was located 12 to 25 miles (20 to 40 kilometers) beneath western Valles Marineris. The team examined the amplitudes and arrival directions of seismic waves to reconstruct the event’s source mechanism. Seismic vibrations on Mars can result from meteorite impacts, landslides, or fractures within the crust. From orbit images show a region crossed by long-lived fault systems. A strike-slip fault, where two blocks of crust slide horizontally past each other, made the vibrations. Neither meteorite impacts nor large landslides can explain the observations. No nearby fresh craters or major landslides were visible.

=== Heat Flow and Physical Properties Package ===
On 28 February 2019, the Heat Flow and Physical Properties Package probe (mole) started digging into the surface of Mars. The probe and its digging mole were intended to reach a maximum depth of 5 m (16 ft) but it only went about 0.35 m (1.1 ft), or three-quarters of the way out of its housing structure. After many attempts, the effort was given up as a failure in January 2021.

InSight – Heat probe problem (June 2019)

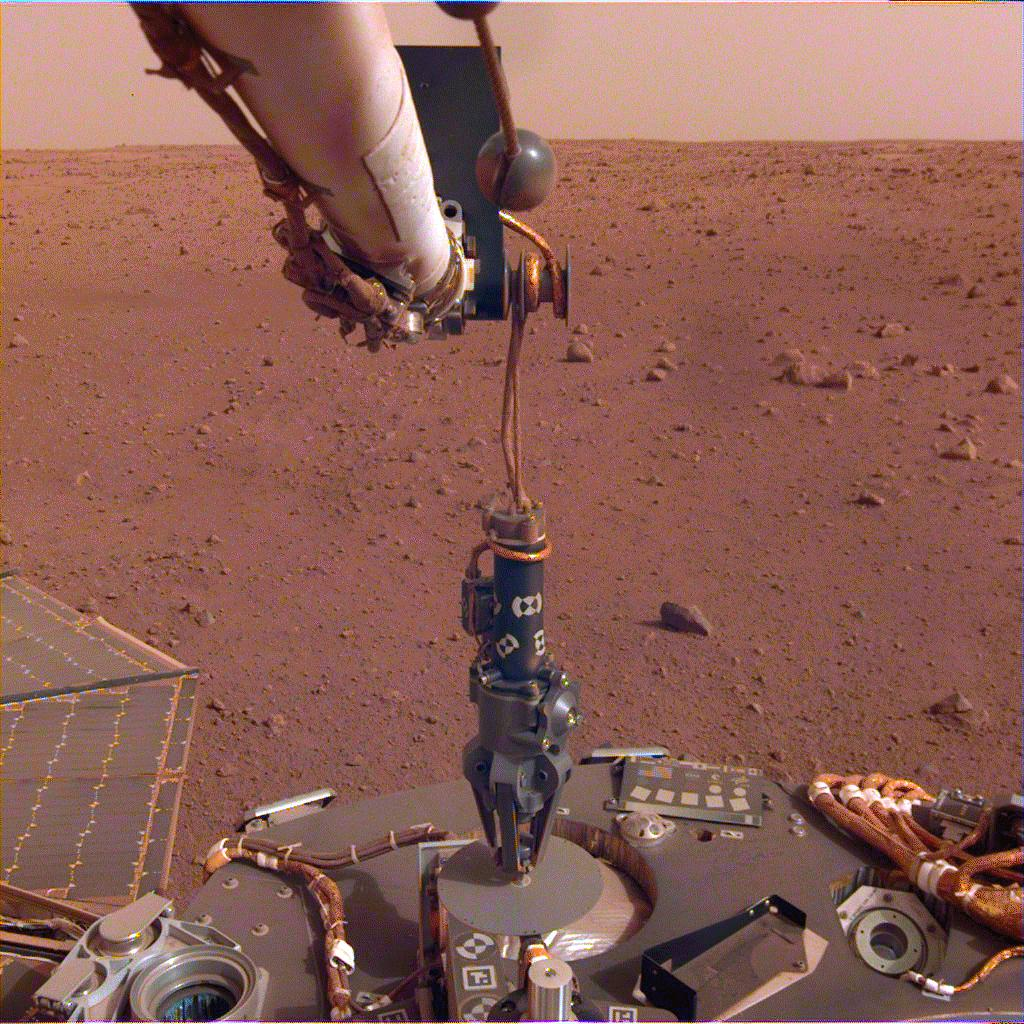
Deploying probe

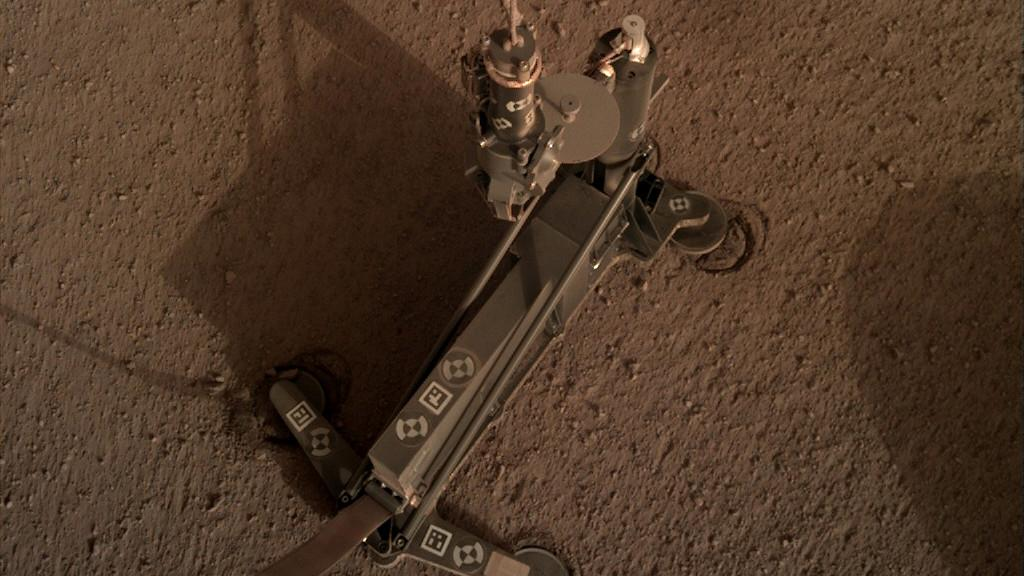
Problem – signs of shifting

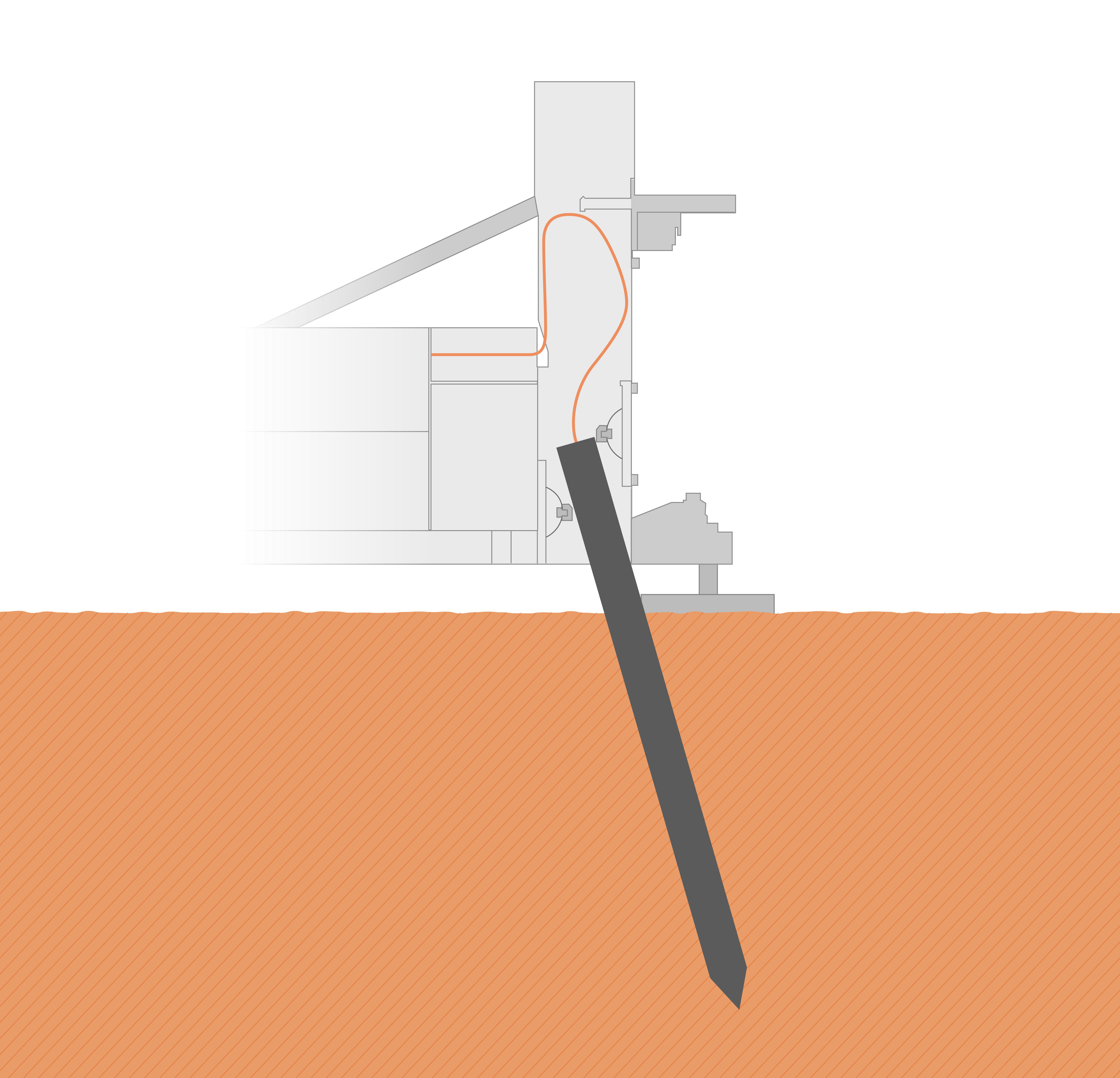
Current position

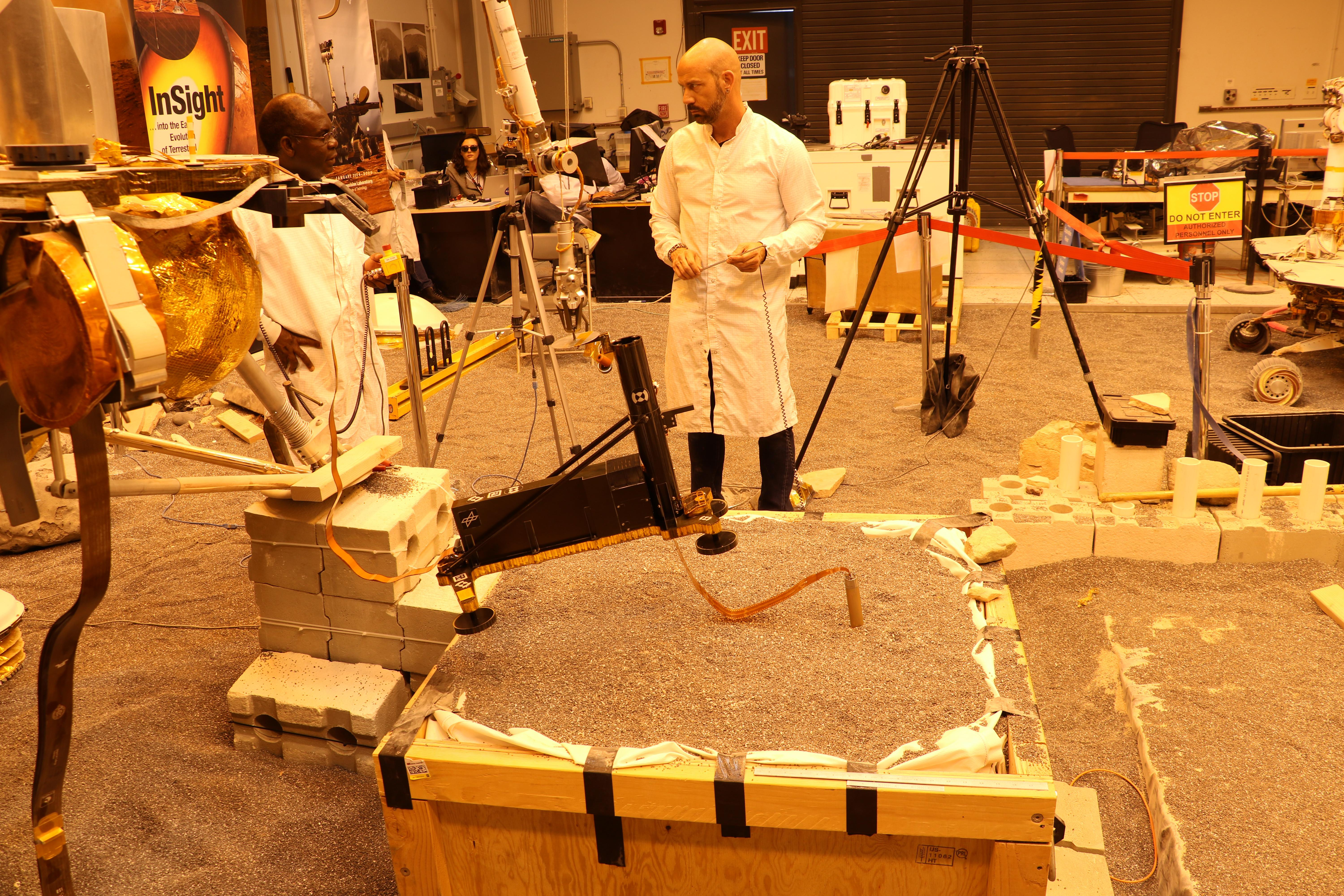
Testing solutions

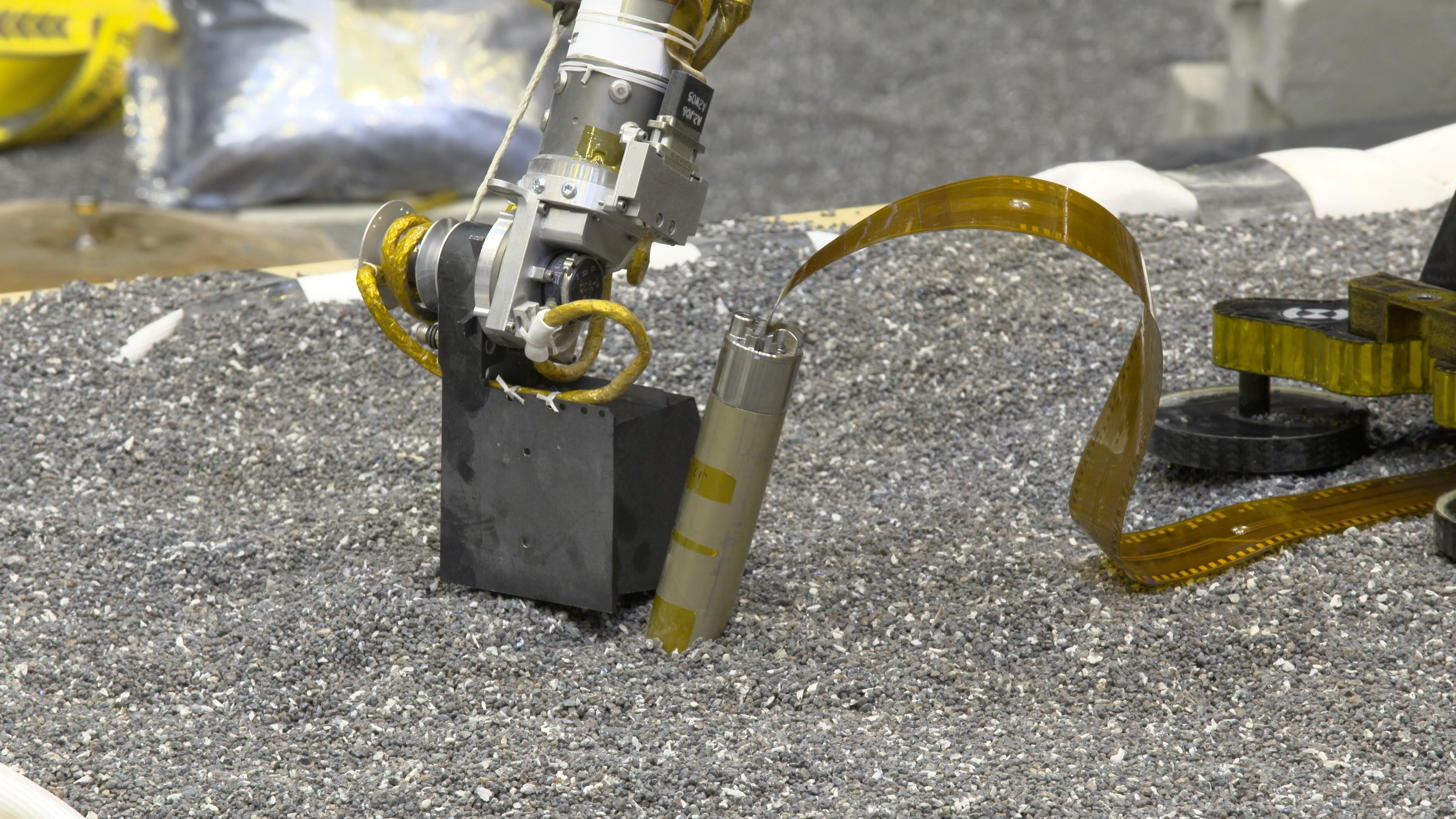
Possible solution

Prep for solution

"Mole" uncovered

Mars InSight Lander - Attempts to solve mole problem

"Pinning" helps to bury the mole. (17 October 2019)

Mole partially backs out of the hole it made. (26 October 2019)

Mole tests (3 November 2019)

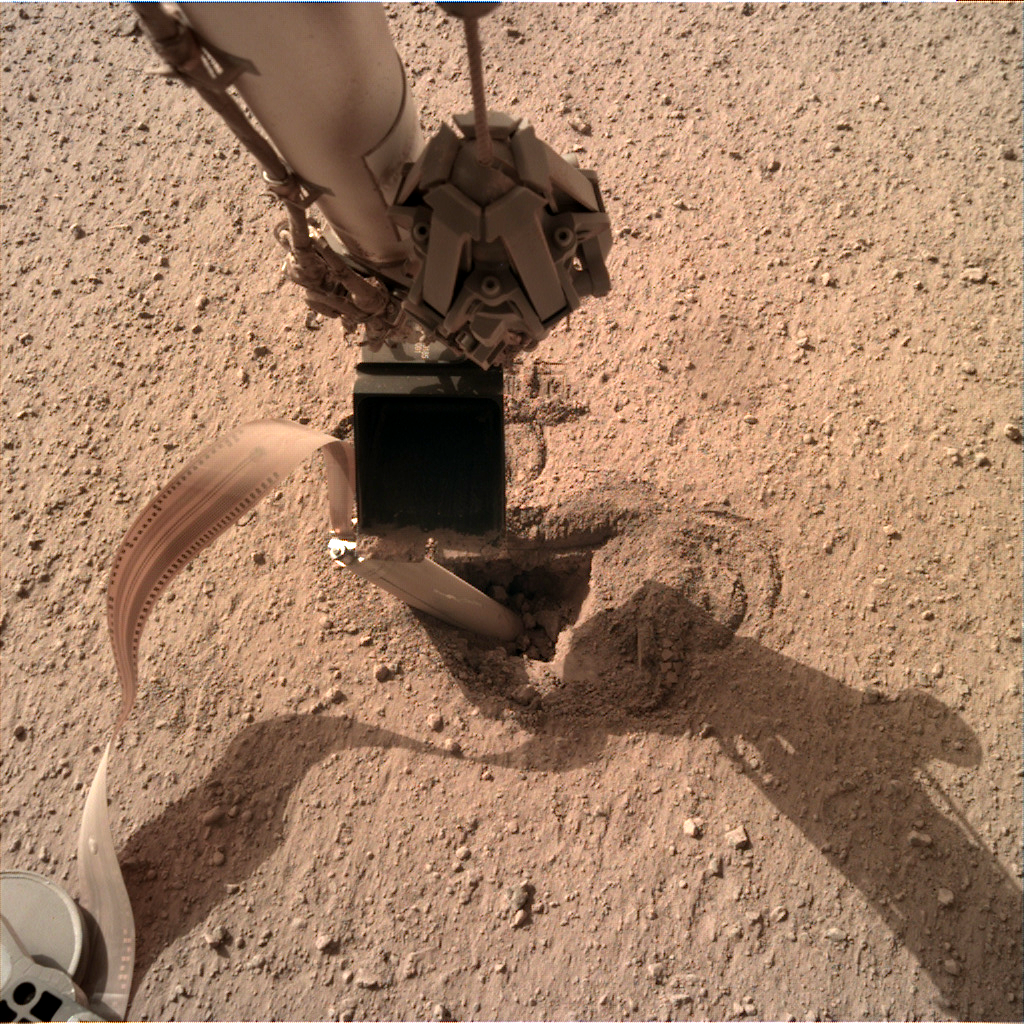
Insight lander using its scoop to push on the back cap of the HP^{3} mole

In October 2019, the researchers at JPL concluded that the soil on Mars does not provide necessary friction for drilling, causing the mole to bounce around and form a wide pit around itself rather than dig deeper. They attempted a maneuver called pinning in which they pressed the side of the scoop against the mole location to pin the side of the wall of the hole and increase friction. Pinning was initially successful, but then the mole backed out of its hole after a few weeks, suggesting the soil is accumulating below the mole.

In February 2020, the team reevaluated the risks of pushing the scoop directly against the back cap of the mole, and determined the procedure to be acceptable.

In June 2020, the team reported that the mole was finally underground, and was being evaluated to determine if the mole was able to dig as designed. On 9 July 2020, it was revealed that images taken on 20 June 2020 showed the mole bouncing again, indicating that it did not have sufficient friction to dig deeper. One suggested solution was to partially fill the hole with soil to increase friction.

Mars InSight Lander - "Mole" - Final Efforts (9 January 2021)

By August 2020, the operations team had made some progress using the scoop to assist the mole in digging deeper into its hole, by pressing against the back. The scoop was used to fill the hole of the partially submerged mole, burying it fully for the first time. The team hoped the mole can now dig further into the surface on its own, possibly with the additional assistance of the scoop.

On 14 January 2021, the heat probe part of the mission was declared to be over, after the science team had determined that the soil properties at the landing location were incompatible with what the instrument had been designed for. The team attempted many different remedies over nearly two years to get the mole to burrow into the soil, but in the end, the attempts did not succeed. The friction between the soil and the probe was not enough for the mole to hammer itself down through the soil. Another set of attempts to get the probe deeper took place on 9 January 2021. After they proved unsuccessful, the decision was made to leave the probe as is and end attempts to dig deeper.

The mole did, with all the assisting measures, burrow itself completely underground. The top of the mole is 2 to 3 centimetres below the Martian surface. To be able to produce the intended scientific measurements, the mole needed to have dug itself at least 3 metres deep. Thus the mole was unsuccessful at producing its intended scientific results.

However, the mole's operations did produce useful and interesting results about the soil at the InSight site; about conducting excavation, or drilling, on Mars; and about operating the lander's robotic arm through the mole-rescue efforts that used the arm in ways that were unplanned before the mission.

== MarCO spacecraft ==
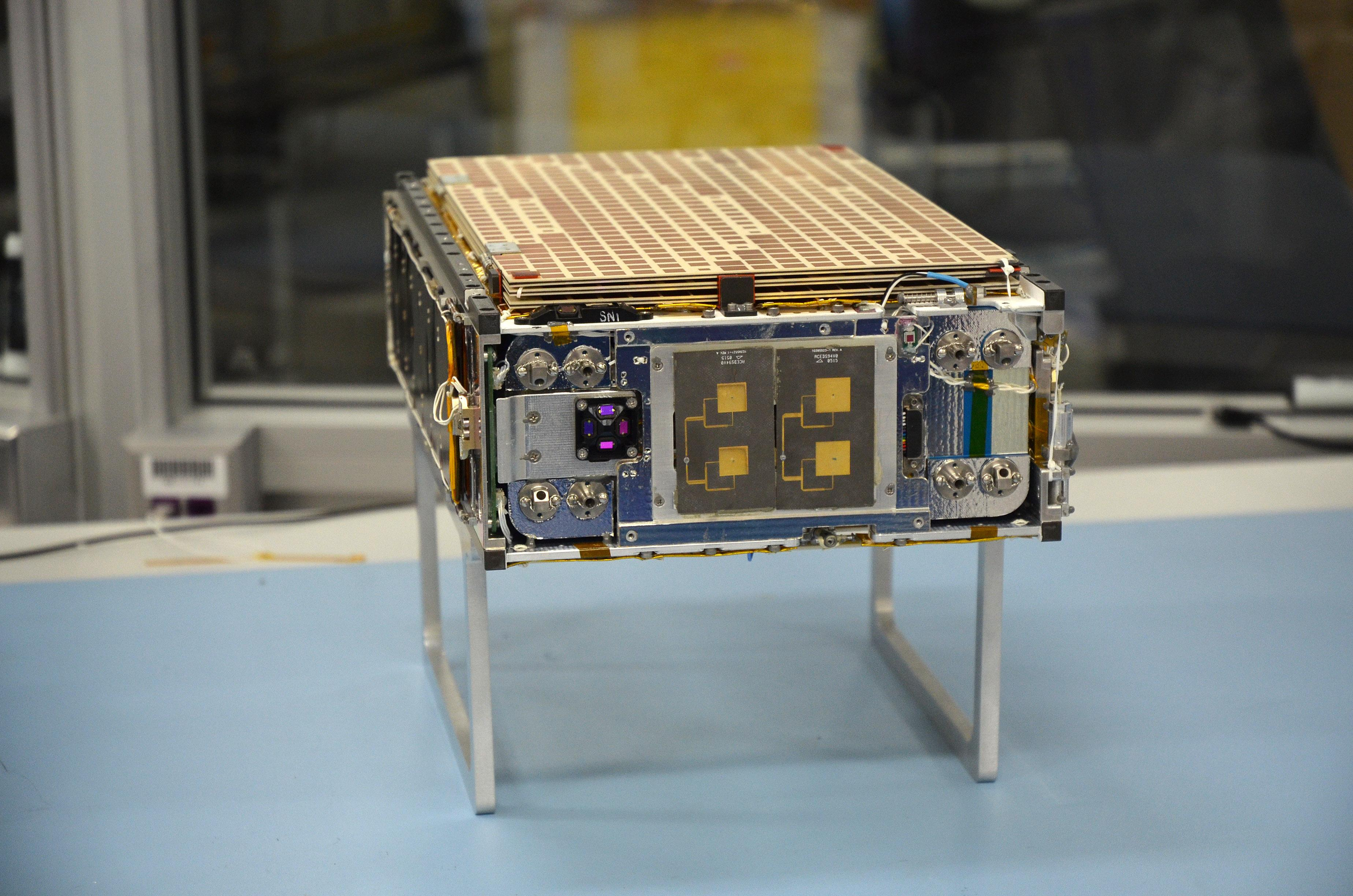
Flight hardware of Mars Cube One (MarCO) (folded up)

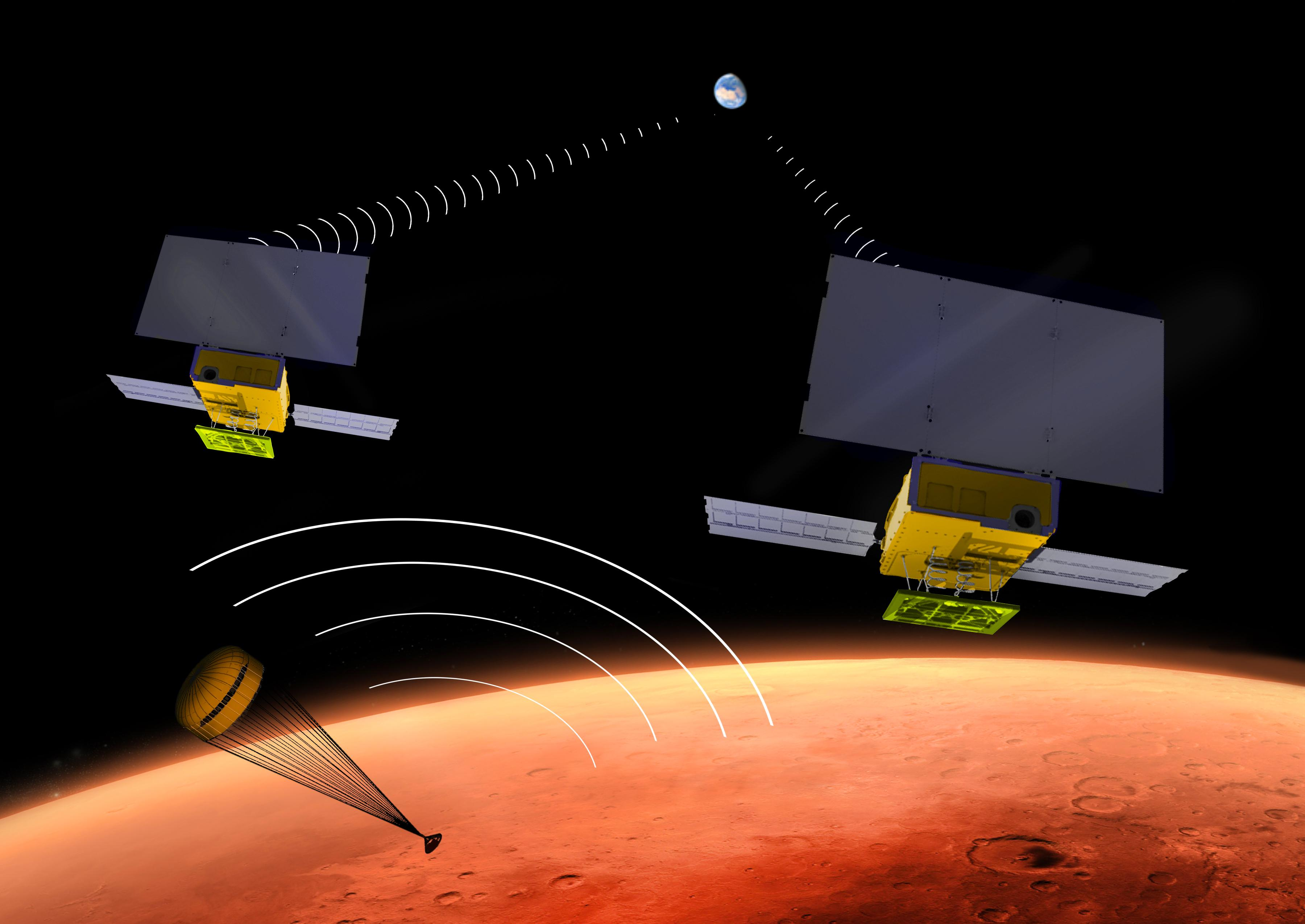
MarCO CubeSats relaying data during InSight's landing (artist concept)

The Mars Cube One (MarCO) spacecraft are a pair of 6U CubeSats that piggybacked with the InSight mission to test CubeSat navigation and endurance in deep space, and to help relay real-time communications (with an eight-minute lightspeed delay) during the probe's entry, descent and landing (EDL) phase. The two 6U CubeSats, named MarCO A and B, are identical. They were launched along with InSight, but separated soon after reaching space, and they flew as a pair for redundancy while flanking the lander. They did not enter orbit, but flew past Mars during the EDL phase of the mission and relayed InSight's telemetry in real time. The success of the MarCO spacecraft proved the viability of the cubesat platform for deep space missions and helped serve as a technical demonstration for potential future missions of a similar nature. On 5 February 2019, NASA reported that the CubeSats went silent, and are unlikely to be heard from again.

- Mass: 13.5 kg (30 lb) each.
- Dimensions: 30 cm × 20 cm × 10 cm (11.8 in × 7.9 in × 3.9 in) each
- Each has a reflectarray high gain antenna
- Miniaturized radio operating in UHF (receive only) and X-band (receive and transmit).
- They carry a miniature wide-angle camera.
- Cold gas thrusters for attitude adjustments.
- Star tracker for navigation.

== Team and participation ==
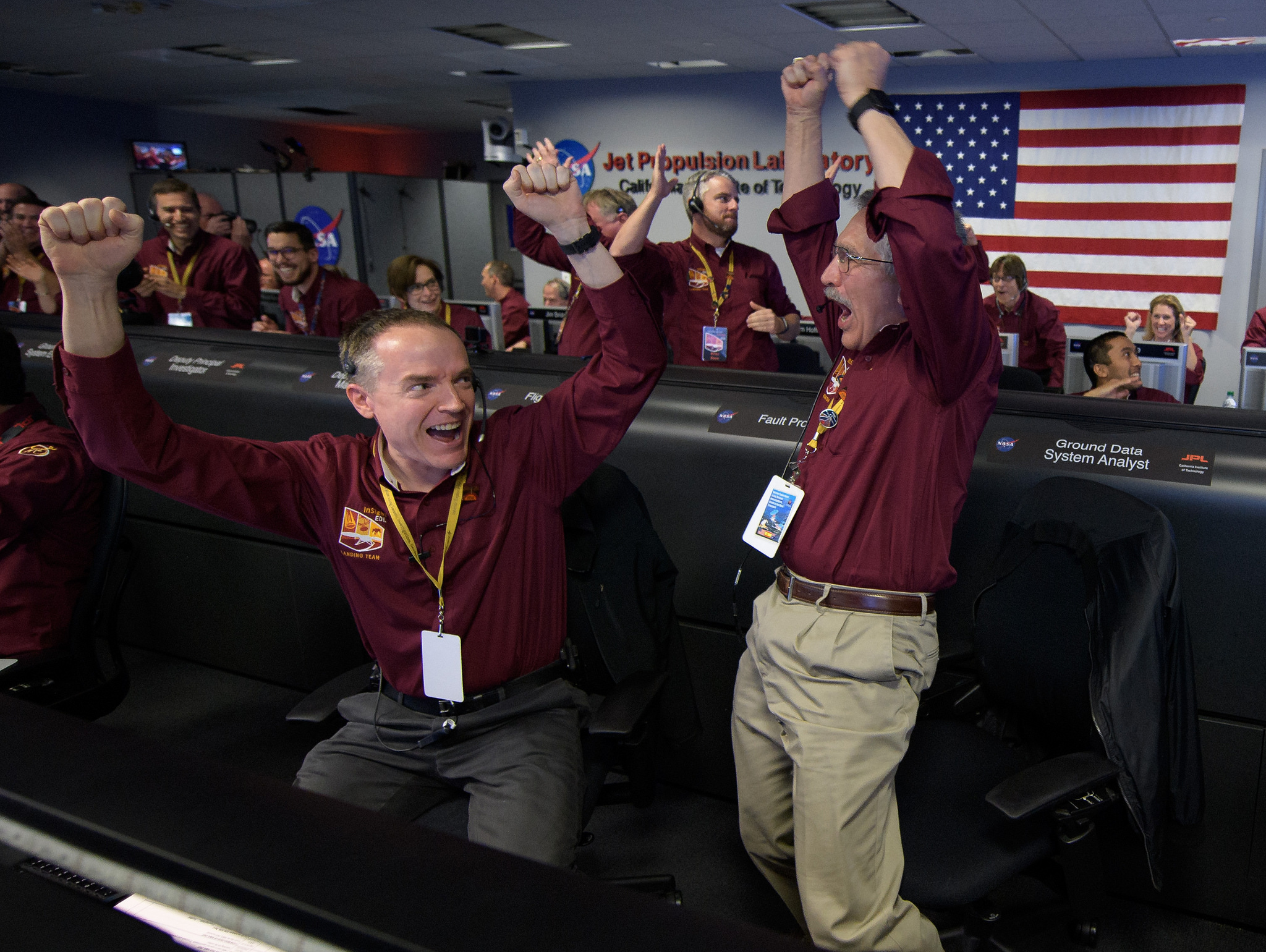
NASA team cheers as the InSight Lander touches down on Mars. (26 November 2018).

The InSight science and engineering team includes scientists and engineers from many disciplines, countries and organizations. The science team assigned to InSight includes scientists from institutions in the U.S., France, Germany, Austria, Belgium, Canada, Japan, Switzerland, Spain, Poland and the United Kingdom.

Mars Exploration Rover project scientist W. Bruce Banerdt is the principal investigator for the InSight mission and the lead scientist for the SEIS instrument. Suzanne Smrekar, whose research focuses on the thermal evolution of planets and who has done extensive testing and development on instruments designed to measure the thermal properties and heat flow on other planets, is the lead for InSight's HP^{3} instrument. The Principal Investigator for RISE is William Folkner at JPL. The SEIS Instrument PI is Philippe Lognonné of IPGP, and the HP3 Instrument PI is Tilman Spohn of the DLR Institute of Planetary Research. The InSight mission team also includes project manager Tom Hoffman and deputy project manager Henry Stone.

Major contributing agencies and institutions are:

- National Aeronautics and Space Administration (NASA)
- Centre National d'Études Spatiales (CNES)
- German Aerospace Center (DLR)
- Italian Space Agency (ASI)
- Jet Propulsion Laboratory (NASA/JPL)
- Lockheed Martin
- Paris Institute of Earth Physics (IPGP)
- Swiss Federal Institute of Technology in Zurich (ETHZ)
- Max Planck Institute for Solar System Research (MPS)
- Imperial College London
- Institut supérieur de l'aéronautique et de l'espace (ISAE-SUPAERO)
- University of Oxford
- Spanish Astrobiology Center (CAB)
- Space Research Centre of Polish Academy of Sciences (CBK)

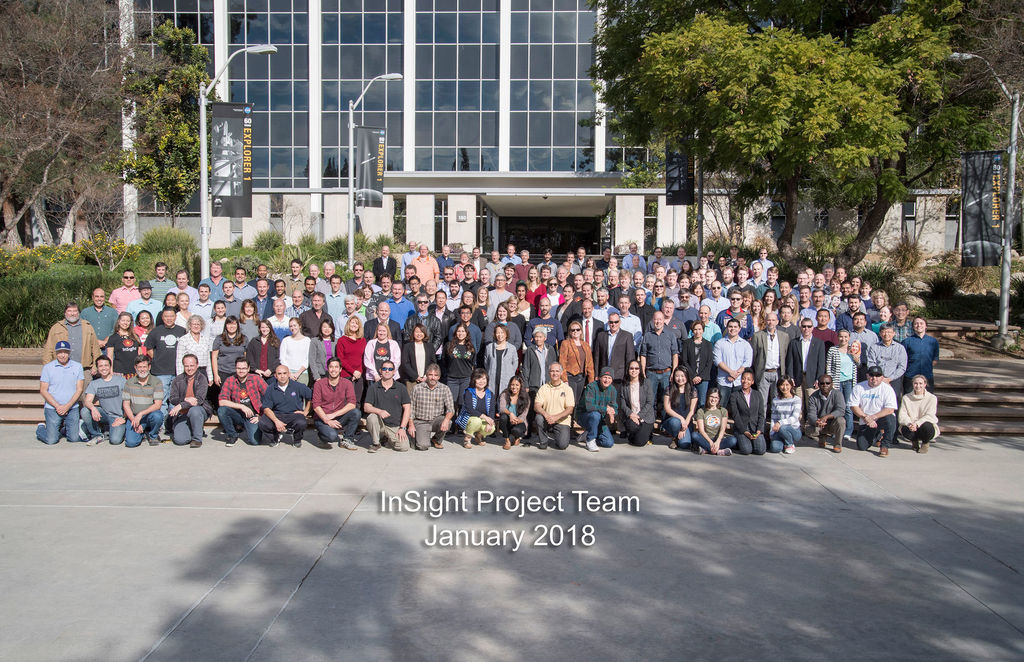
InSight team at JPL

== Name chips ==
As part of its public outreach, NASA organized a program where members of the public were able to have their names sent to Mars aboard InSight. Due to its launch delay, two rounds of sign-ups were conducted totaling 2.4 million names: 826,923 names were registered in 2015 and a further 1.6 million names were added in 2017. An electron beam was used to etch letters only 1/1000 the width of a human hair (1 μm) onto 8 mm (0.3 in) silicon wafers. The first chip was installed on the lander in November 2015 and the second on 23 January 2018.

Name chips on InSight

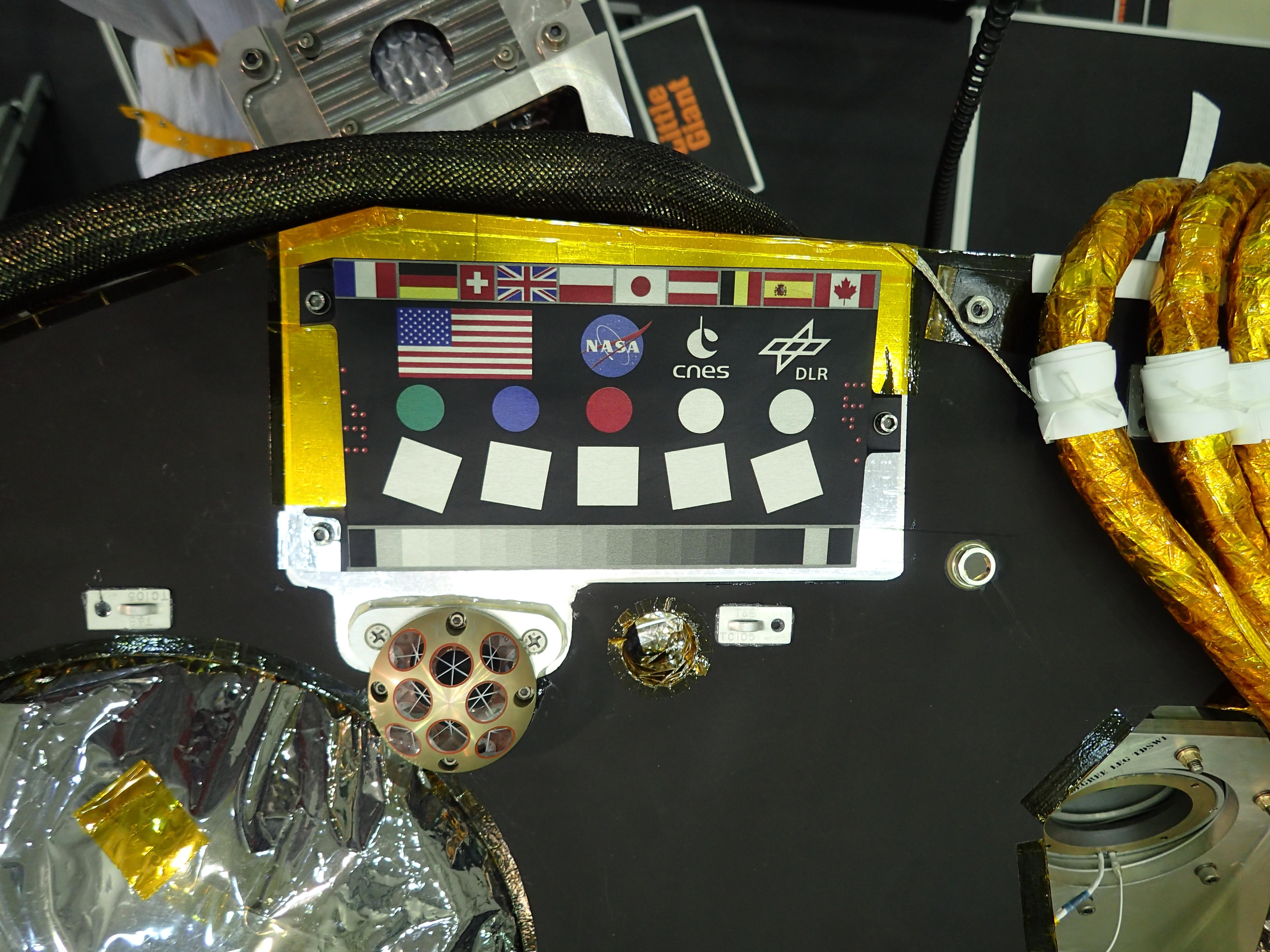
One name chip installed

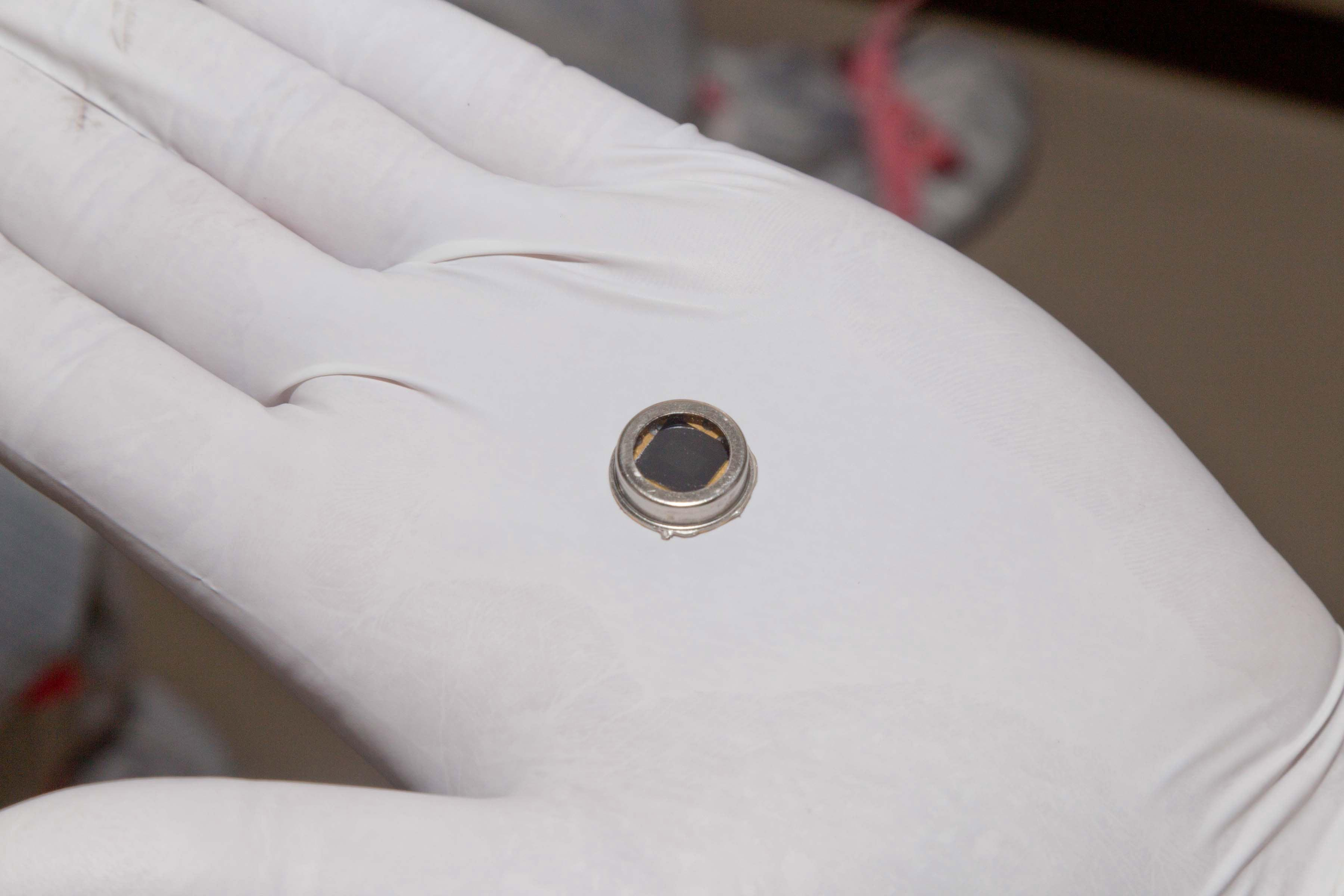
The first name chip for InSight

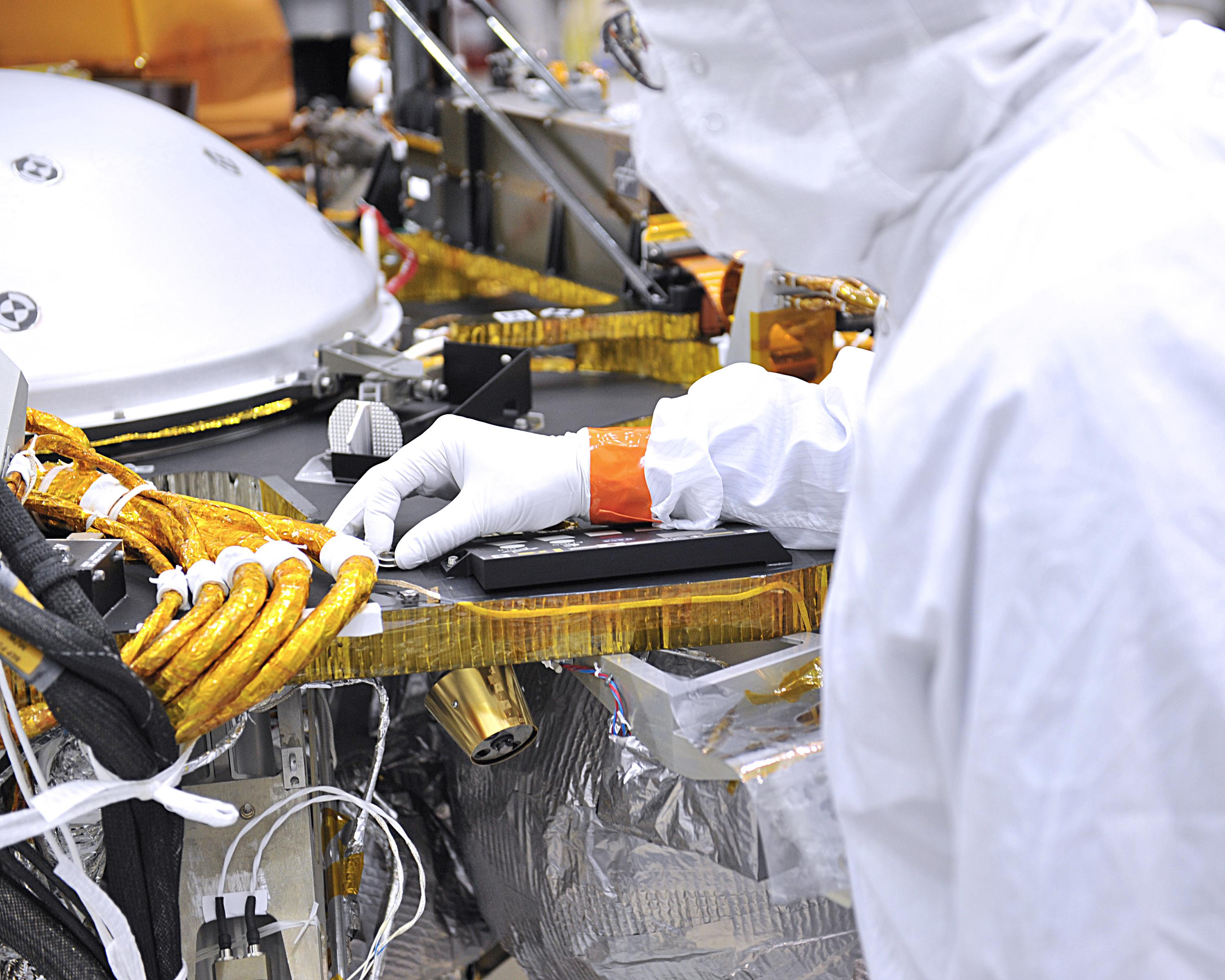
The second name chip, inscribed with 1.6 million names, is placed on InSight in January 2018.

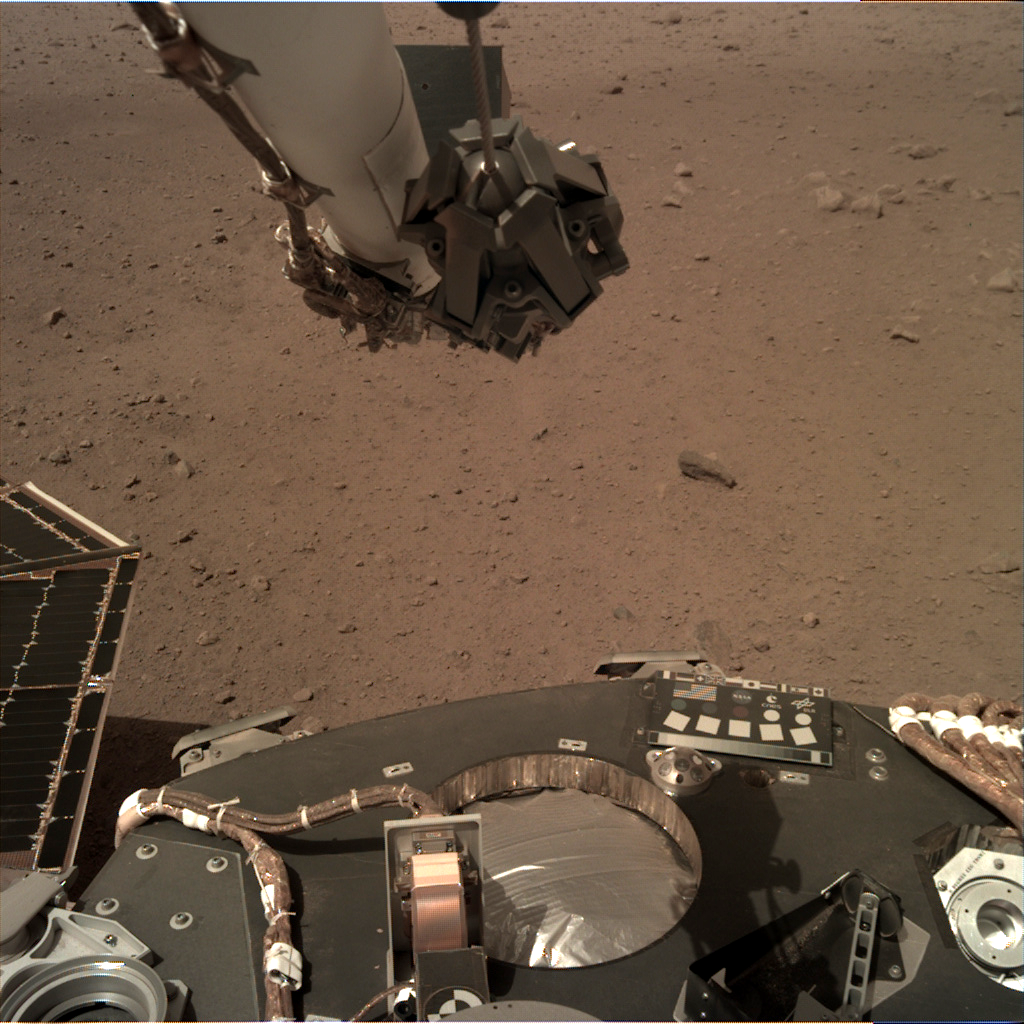
Name chips on Mars

== Gallery ==
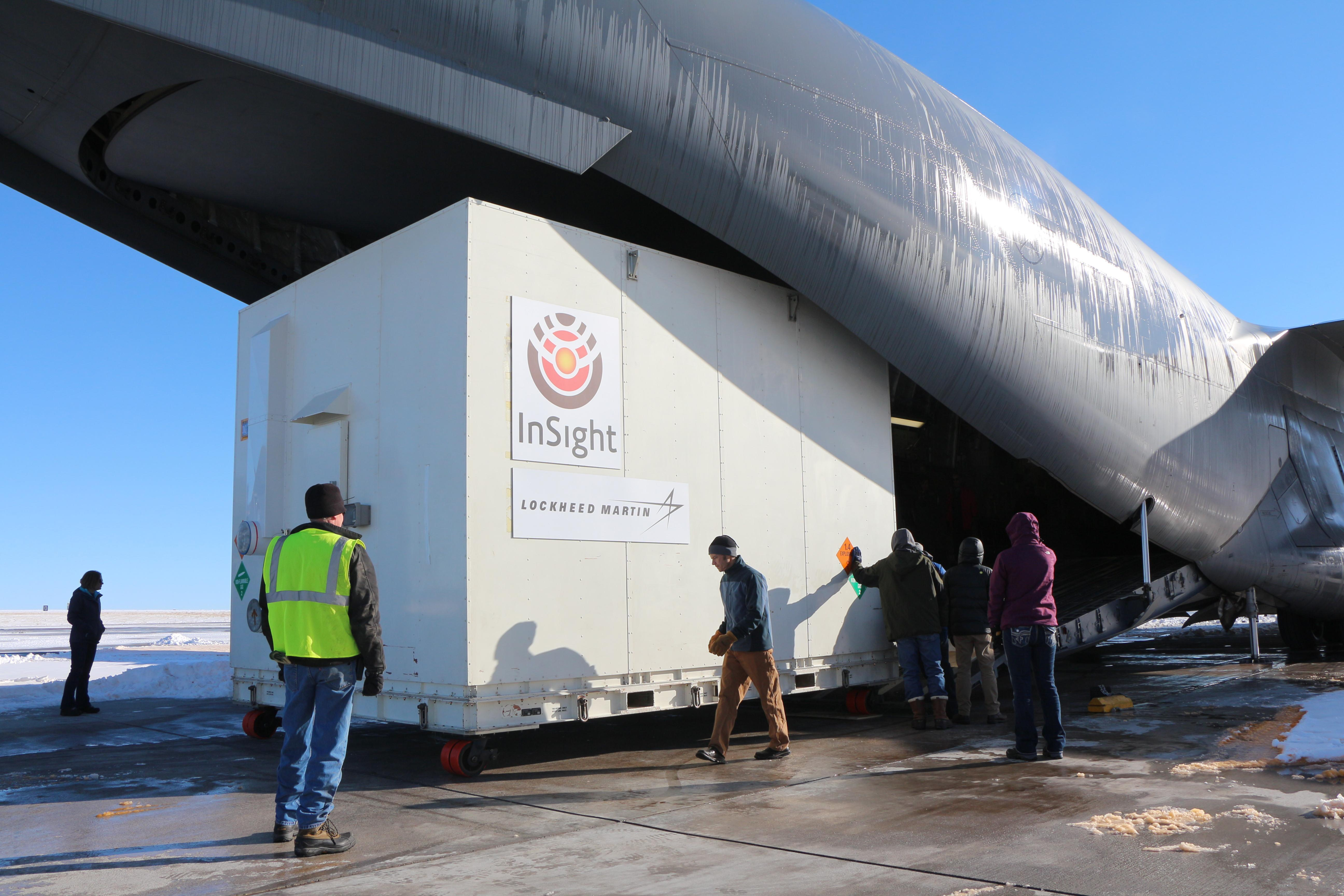
InSight lander loaded on a Boeing C-17 Globemaster III (December 2015)

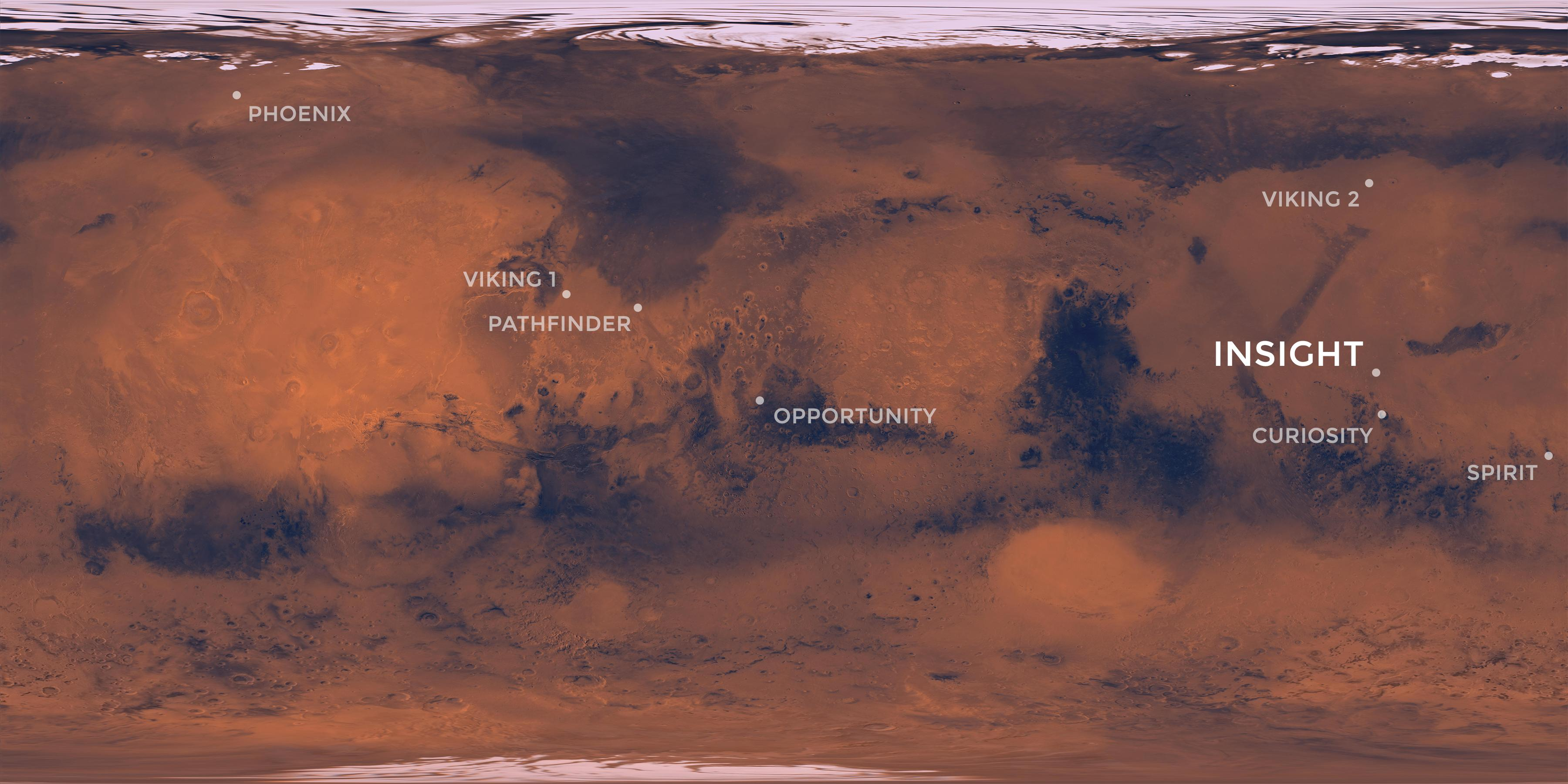
InSight landing zone target with other NASA landing zones

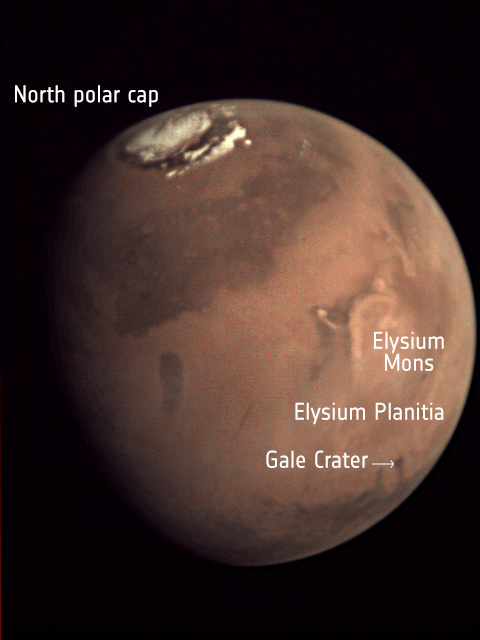
Global view of Mars. InSight landed in Elysium Plantia. Curiosity rover is in Gale crater.

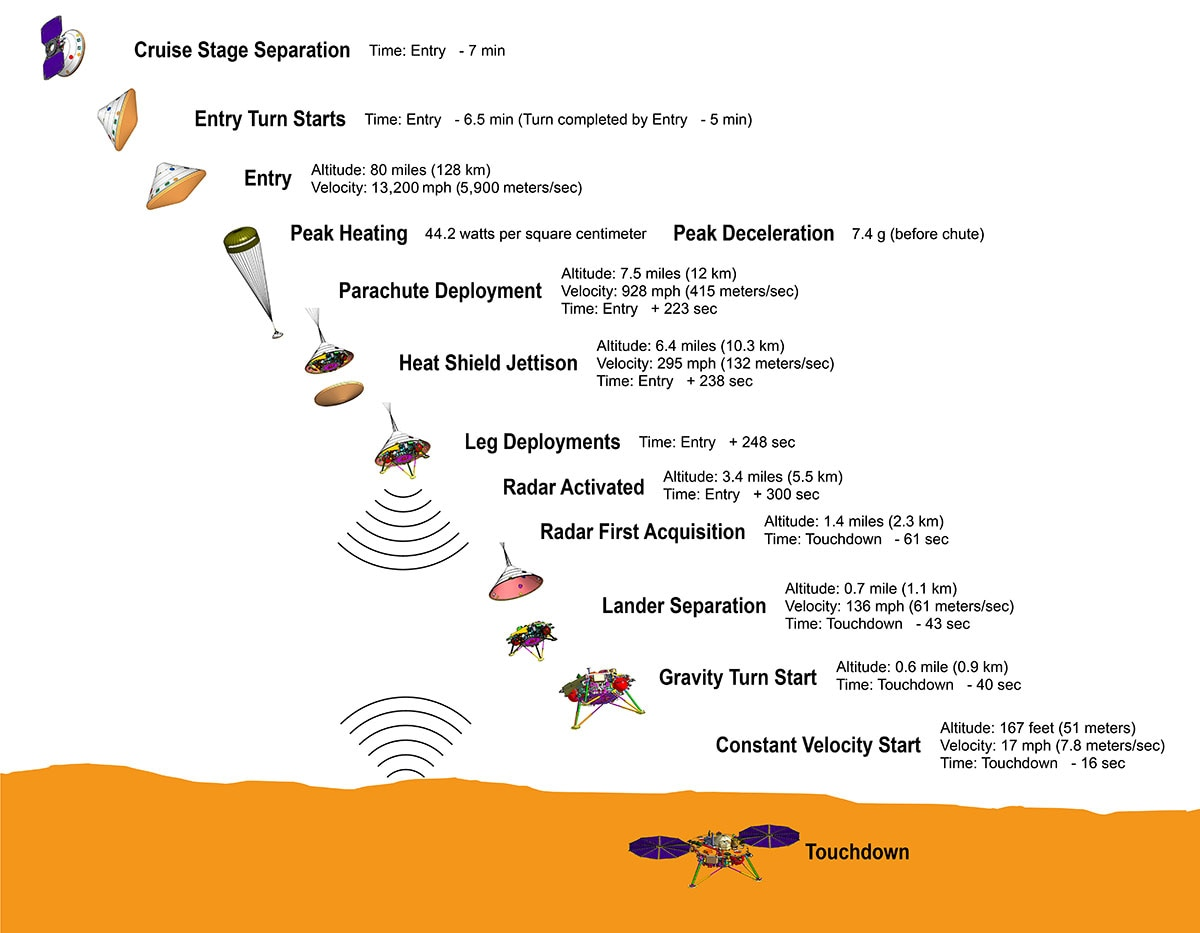
Entry, Descent, and Landing sequence for InSight

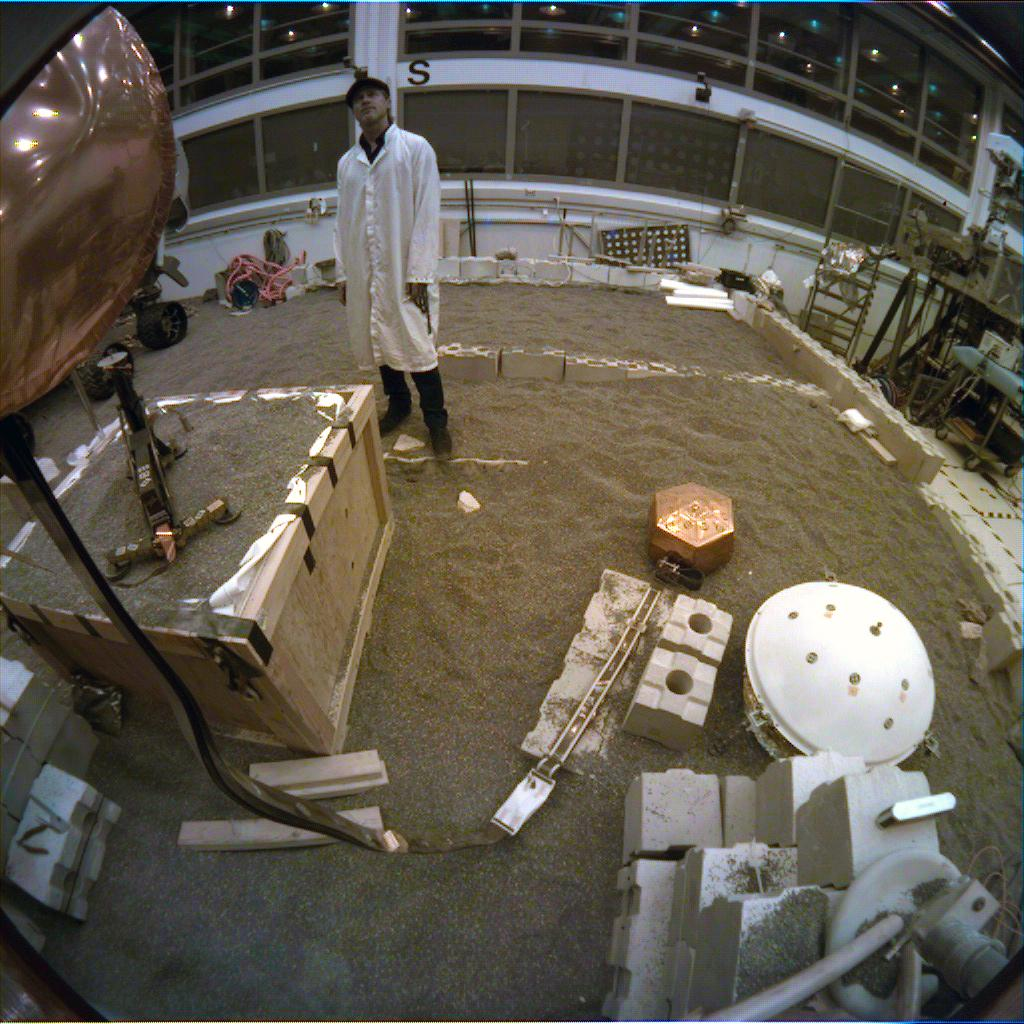
Actor Brad Pitt visits the InSight test "sandbox" (September 2019).

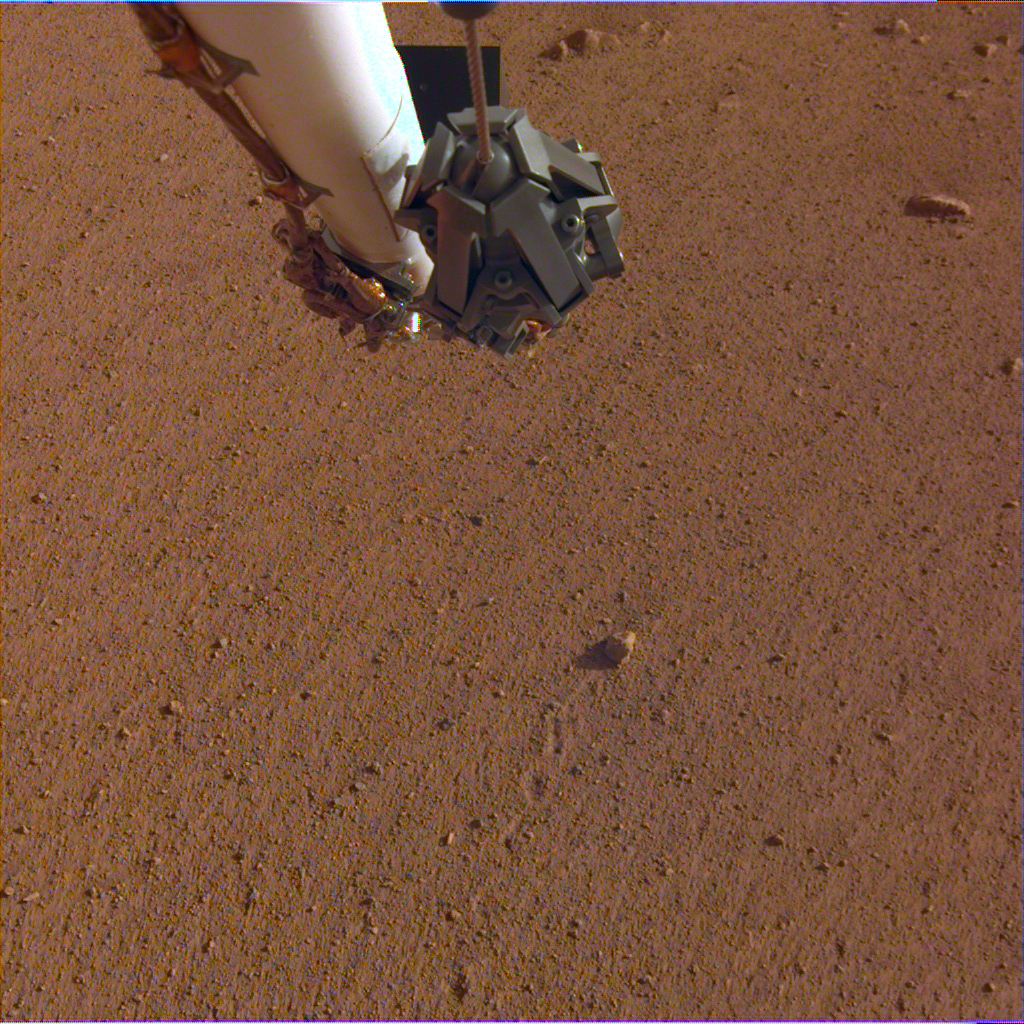
"Rolling Stones Rock"
a result from the landing
(November 2018)
Instrument Context Camera (ICC), November 2018

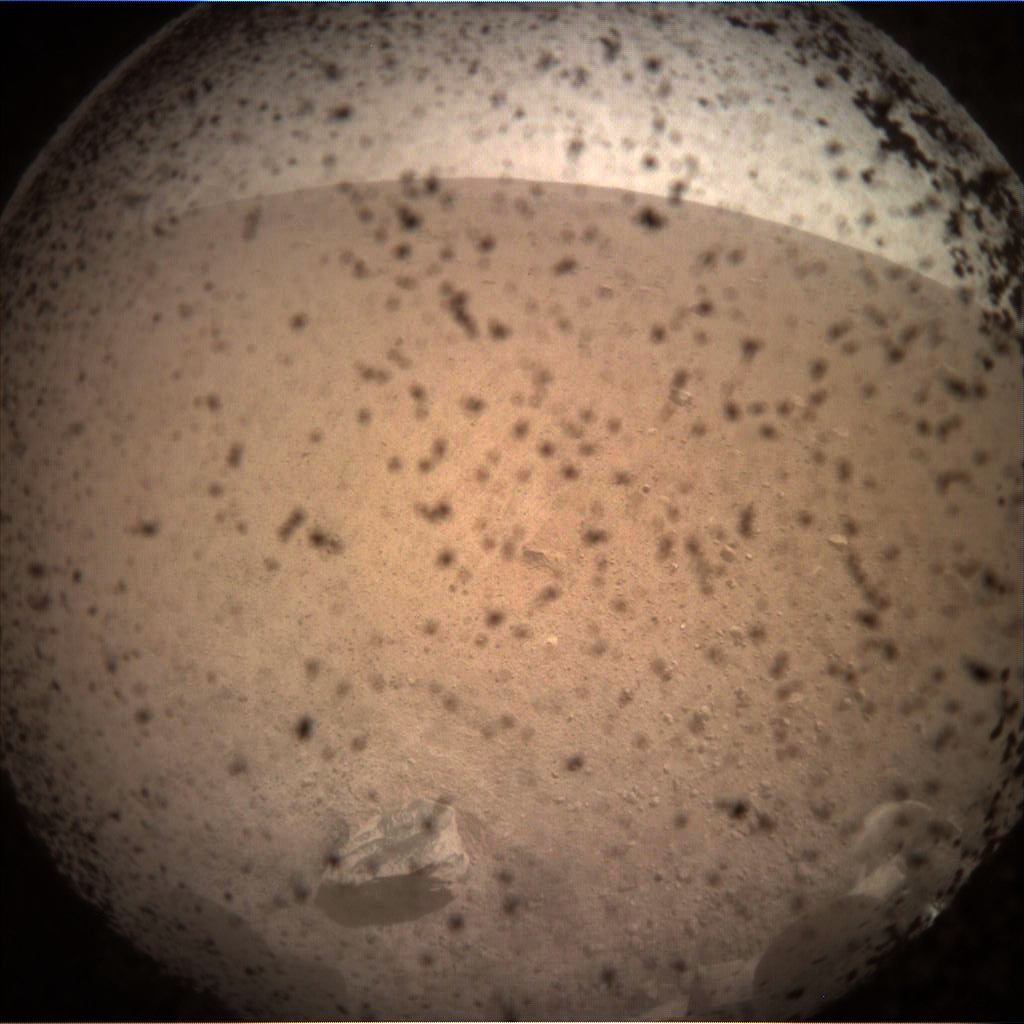
First image from Mars, clear lens cap on

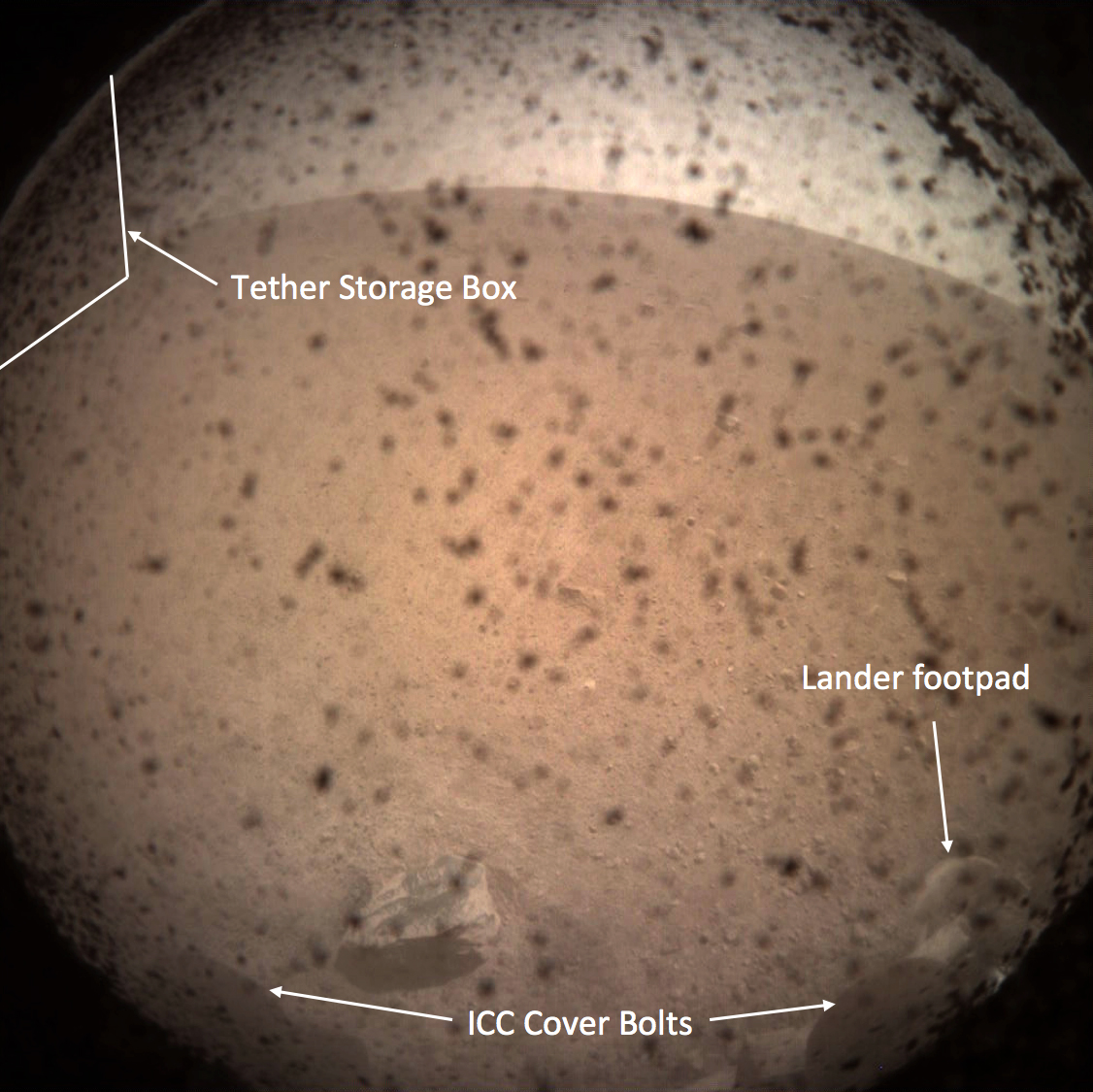
First image with annotations

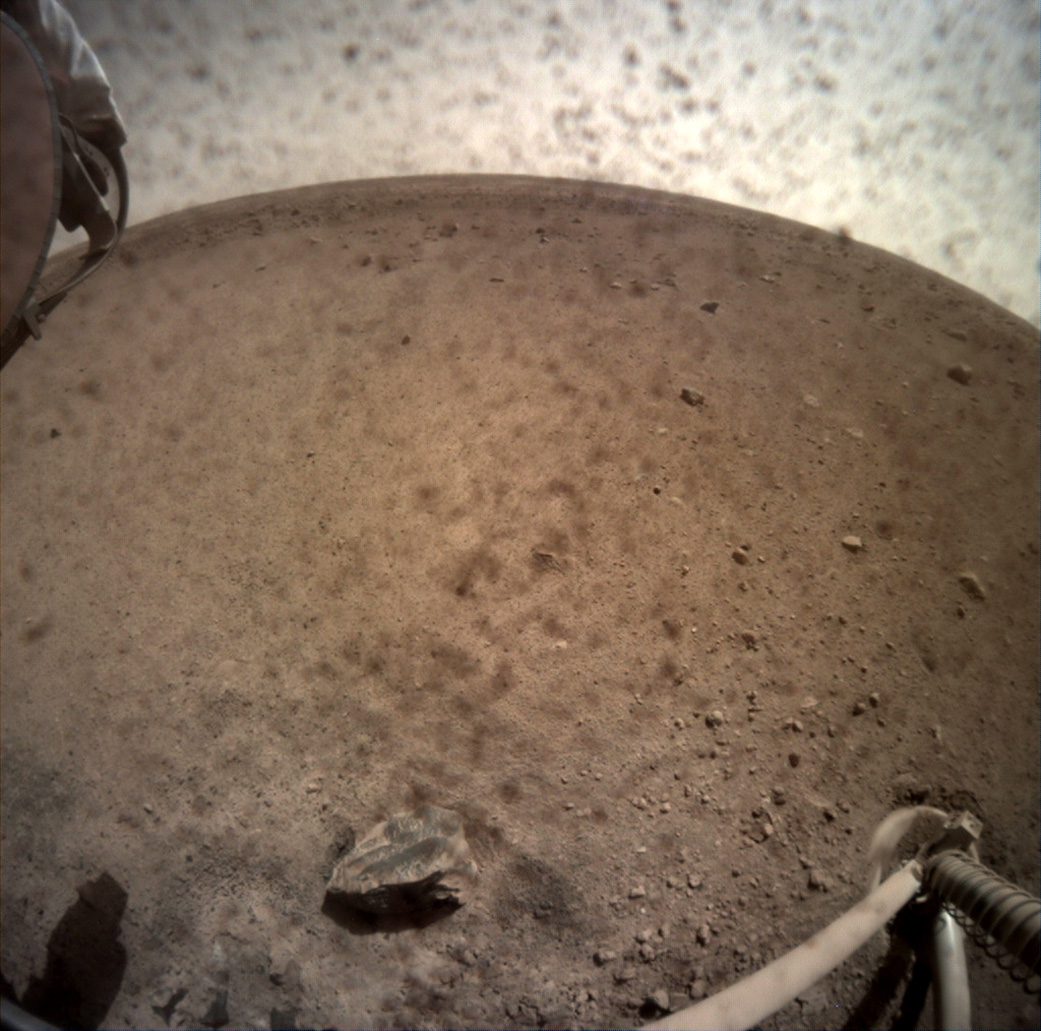
Without clear lens cover

== See also ==
- Exploration of Mars
- List of missions to Mars
