= HP3 =

HP3 or variant, may refer to:

- HP3, a postcode for Hemel Hempstead, see HP postcode area
- hP3, a Pearson symbol
- Harry Potter and the Prisoner of Azkaban, the third Harry Potter novel
- Harry Potter and the Prisoner of Azkaban (film), the third Harry Potter film
- Handley Page Type C a.k.a. H.P.3, an airplane
- HP-3, a glider designed by Richard Schreder
- HP3, a type of photographic stock, see Ilford HP
- HP^{3}, Heat Flow and Physical Properties Package, an instrument aboard the InSight Mars lander
- Hydrogen triphosphide

== See also ==
- HP (disambiguation)
