= HPS =

HPS may refer to:

== Education ==
- Halepaghen Grammar School, in Buxtehude, Germany
- Hamtramck Public Schools, in Michigan, United States
- Hastings Public Schools (Nebraska), in the United States
- Headlands Preparatory School, in California, United States
- Highline Public Schools, in Washington, United States
- History and philosophy of science
- Hyderabad Public School, in India
- Habib Public School, in Pakistan

== Health and medicine ==
- Hantavirus pulmonary syndrome, transmitted by rodents
- Harris platelet syndrome
- Health Physics Society
- Health Protection Scotland
- Heart Protection Study, a British clinical trial
- Hermansky–Pudlak syndrome

== Technology ==
- Handley Page HPS, a prototype aircraft
- High-pressure sodium, a type of lamp
- Hindawi Programming System
- HPS stain, a tissue stain
- Hydraulic power steering, a power steering system in automobiles
- Hydroelectric power station or hydropower station
- Ilford HPS, a type of photographic film

== Other uses ==
- 3-hexulose-6-phosphate synthase
- Croatian Mountaineering Association (Croatian: Hrvatski planinarski savez; HPS)
- Croatian Popular Party (disambiguation) (Croatian: Hrvatska pučka stranka; HPS)
- Hazelwood Power Station, Lantrobe Valley, Victoria, Australia
- Hawai'i Sign Language (ISO 639 language code hps)
- Hawkes Pocket Scores, a series of pocket scores
- Heartland Payment Systems, an American payment processing company
- Helsingin Palloseura, a Finnish sport club
- Horizon Plus (ICAO airline code HPS), see List of airline codes (H)
- HPS Investment Partners LLC, an American investment firm
- Humanist Party of Switzerland
- Hundred Peaks Section, an American mountaineering society
- Protection Force of Sinjar (Kurdish: Hêza Parastina Şingal, HPŞ)

== See also ==
- HPSS (disambiguation)
- HP (disambiguation), for the singular of HPs
