= Seismic Experiment for Interior Structure =

Scientific instrument aboard the InSight Mars lander

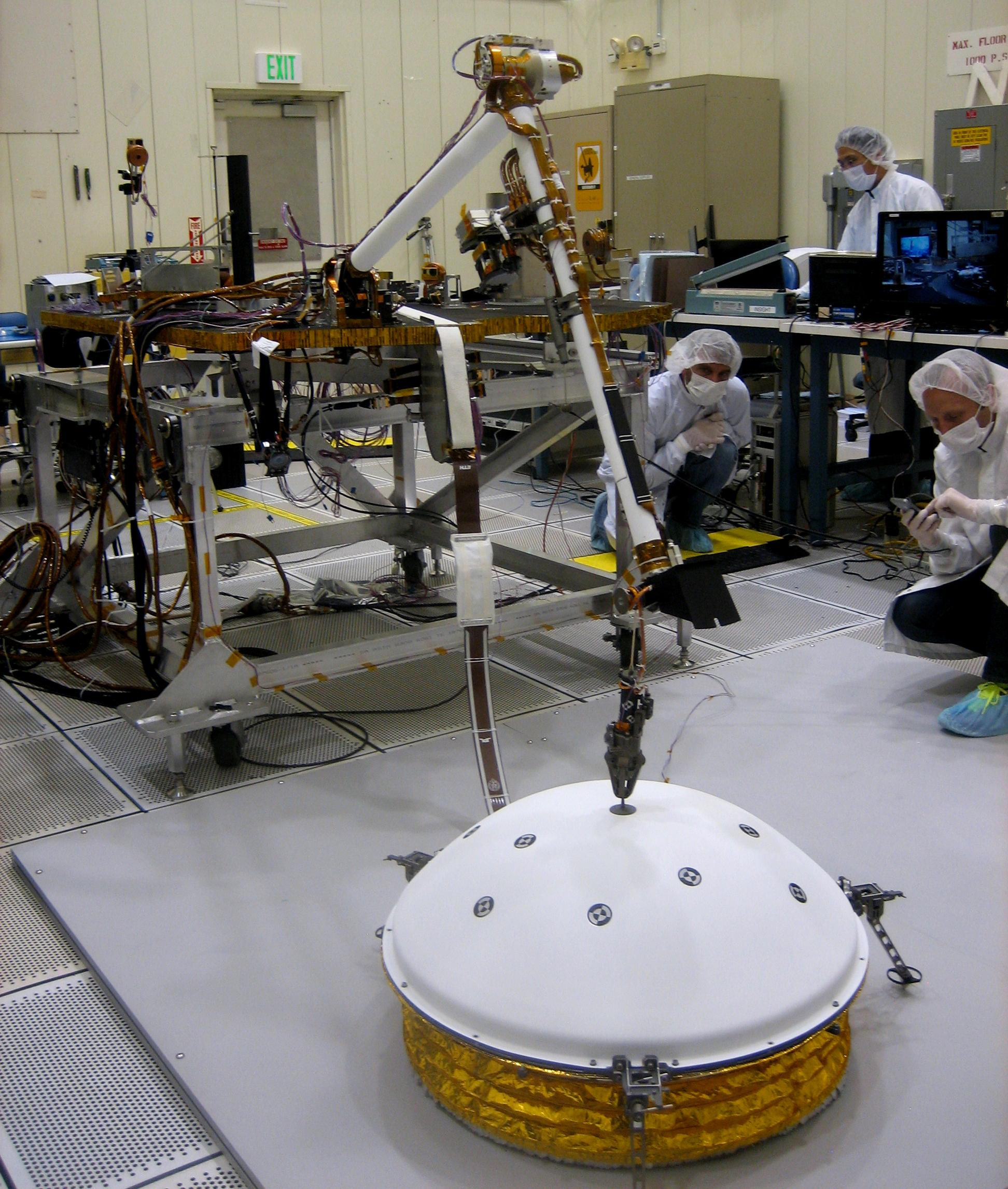
- Testing of the lander's robotic arm that deployed the seismometer
- Operator: NASA
- Manufacturer: CNES
- Instrument type: geophysical observations
- Function: seismometer
- Mission duration: Planned: 2 years on Mars Final: 1446 sols (1485 days)
- Began operations: Landing: 26 November 2018
- Ceased operations: 21 December 2022
- Website: www.seis-insight.eu/en/

Properties
- Mass: 29.5 kg (65 lb)
- Dimensions: Vacuum chamber volume: 3 L (0.66 imp gal; 0.79 US gal)
- Power consumption: 8.5 W
- Data rate: 38 megabits/day

Host spacecraft
- Spacecraft: InSight
- Operator: NASA
- Launch date: 5 May 2018, 11:05 UTC
- COSPAR ID: 2018-042A

The Seismic Experiment for Interior Structure (SEIS) is a seismometer and the primary scientific instrument on board the InSight Mars lander launched on 5 May 2018 for a landing on 26 November 2018; the instrument was deployed to the surface of Mars on 19 December. SEIS is expected to provide seismic measurements of marsquakes, enabling researchers to develop 3D structure maps of the deep interior. Better understanding the internal structure of Mars will lead to better understanding of the Earth, Moon, and rocky planetary bodies in general.

SEIS detected marsquakes in Cerberus Fossae in 2019.

On 24 December 2021, the seismometer for the InSight mission on Mars detected a large seismic event with a distinct signature. The event was caused by a meteor impact on the surface of Mars, which was confirmed by satellite observations of a newly formed 150-meter crater. As of 21 December 2022, which marks the official end of the InSight mission, SEIS has detected a total of 1319 marsquakes.

== Overview ==
Mars flybys and landings to gather scientific data have been conducted since the 1960s, but quality seismological studies – which would provide detailed information about the interior of Mars – have yet to be performed in the 21st century.

Only two astronomical bodies – the Earth and the Moon – have been studied in this way, and learning about Mars is hoped to contribute to understanding the geology of all rocky planetary bodies.

Other onboard instruments working in synergy with SEIS are the Temperature and Winds for InSight module, the Heat Flow and Physical Properties Package, and the Rotation and Interior Structure Experiment.

=== Earlier missions ===
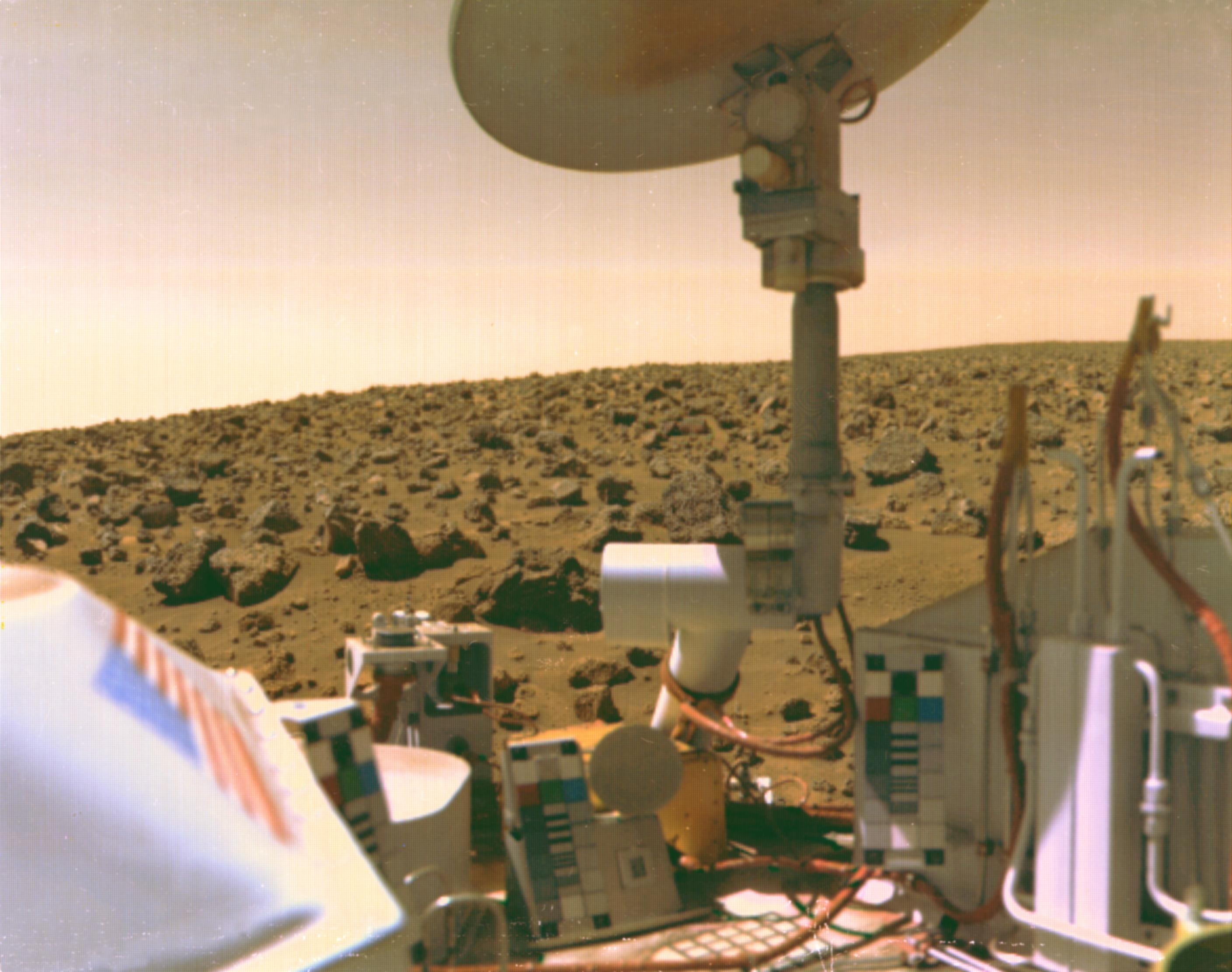
Both Viking Mars landers in the 1970s had a seismometer (part is visible between the calibration targets), but deployment issues hampered meaningful geological data.

While two seismometers were landed on Mars during the Viking missions in 1976, results were limited. Seismometers on both Viking spacecraft were mounted on the lander, which meant that it also picked up vibrations from various operations of the lander and caused by the wind. In addition, the Viking 1 lander's seismometer did not deploy properly.

The seismometer readings were used to estimate a Martian geological crust thickness between 14 and 18 km (8.7 and 11.2 mi) at the Viking 2 lander site. Unexpectedly, the seismometer also detected pressure from the Mars winds, complementing the meteorology results. A single possible candidate for a marsquake was recorded, although it was not confirmed due to the limitations of the design, and interference from other sources of vibration such as wind. Despite these limitations, it was clear that widespread and large marsquakes were not detected.

== Design ==
SEIS is the primary instrument of the InSight mission, and it was designed and produced by the French Space Agency (CNES), with the participation of the Institut de Physique du Globe de Paris (IPGP), the Swiss Federal Institute of Technology (ETH), the Max Planck Institute for Solar System Research (MPS), Imperial College, Institut supérieur de l'aéronautique et de l'espace (ISAE) and JPL. The Principal Investigator is Philippe Lognonné from the Institute of Earth Physics of Paris (Institut de Physique du Globe de Paris), in the E.U.

Its design consists of a 3-axis very-broad-band seismometer (enclosed in a vacuum thermal enclosure) and a 3-axis short-period instrument. Mars is expected to have lower seismic activity than Earth, so minimisation of wind vibrations is critical. The whole assembly is placed under a heavy wind and thermal shield designed to minimize thermal contrasts and offer some protection against gusts of wind.

The tripod-mounted seismometer will take precise measurements of marsquakes and other internal activity on Mars to better understand the planet's history and internal structure. It will also investigate how the Martian crust and mantle respond to the effects of meteorite impacts, which gives clues to the planet's inner structure. The seismometer will also detect sources including atmospheric waves and gravimetric signals (tidal forces) from Mars' moon Phobos, up to high-frequency seismic waves at 50 Hz.

The SEIS instrument is deployed by the Instrument Deployment System, a robotic arm that can position the sensor directly on the surface. The instrument is supported by a suite of meteorological sensors (TWINS) to characterize atmospheric disturbances that might affect the measurements. These include a vector magnetometer provided by UCLA that will measure magnetic disturbances such as those caused by the Martian ionosphere; a suite of air temperature, wind speed and wind direction sensors based on the Spanish/Finnish Rover Environmental Monitoring Station; and a barometer from JPL.

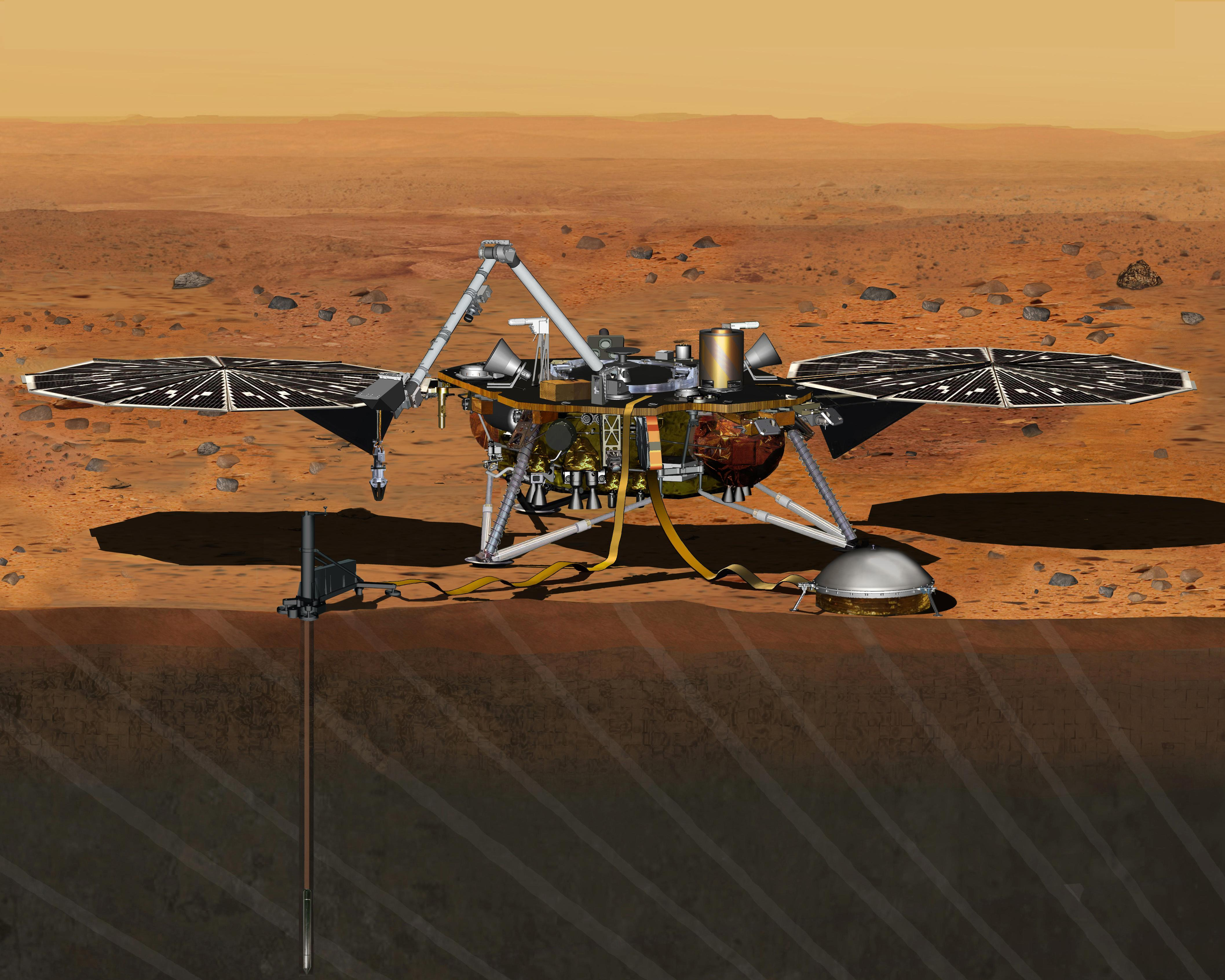
Artist's concept of the SEIS instrument deployed on the Martian surface (right-side). On the left is the HP^{3} instrument burrowing below the surface.

During the final integration of SEIS, several small leaks were found in the vacuum thermal enclosure. This forced the postponement of the InSight launch from 2016 to 2018, and the redesign of a new enclosure under the supervision of JPL. The cost of the delay was estimated to be US$150 million.

Animation of the seismometer being lifted off the saucer by the robotic arm and placed on the surface of Mars

== Operations ==
Illustration from the USGS of how P and S waves from an Earthquake make a shadow zone because of the core.

Routine operations will be split into two services, the Mars Structure Service (MSS) and Marsquake Service (MQS), which will be responsible, respectively, for defining the structure models and seismic activity. Combination of data with results from the InSight radio science and orbital observations will allow for constraint of the deeper structure.

Possible observations include:

- P waves and S waves
- Meteor strikes (see also Category:Meteorites found on Mars)
- Marsquakes
- Impact by other manmade objects
- Tidal forces from Mars' moons
- Interior revelations, such as the presence of a solid or liquid core and its size

=== Single-site seismology ===
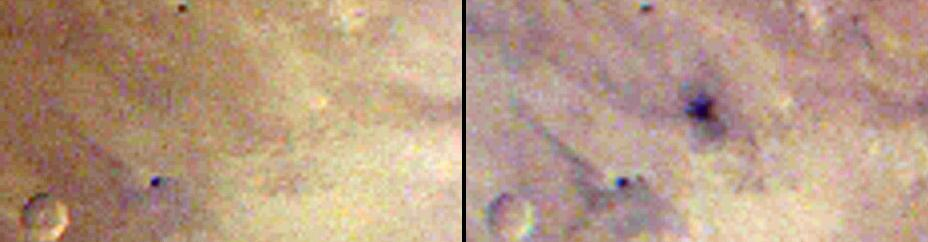
Fresh asteroid impact on Mars at 3.34°N 219.38°E – before/March 27 & after/March 28, 2012 (MRO) It is hoped SEIS may be able to detect vibrations of a strong enough impact on Mars, and if the impact site is located, it allows even more understanding.

During development, the power of multiple sites was noted, but one site offers a tremendous insight to the interior. With a single site, the location of a marsquake event can be constrained to the surface of a sphere, by measuring what are known as P-waves and S-waves.

There is a variety of single-site seismology techniques that can yield data, for example, the detection of an impact on the surface by a meteorite for which the location is identified. If Mars has large marsquakes, they may allow the deep interior to be determined. As the vibrations pass through the planet they are affected by the properties of the materials and its configuration.

For example, the effect of tidal forces on Mars by Phobos, which should be about 10 mm, would be noticeably affected by a liquid Mars core. Even without any marsquake, it should be possible after about six months of observation to use this method to increase or decrease the likelihood Mars has a liquid core.

== Cutaway illustration ==
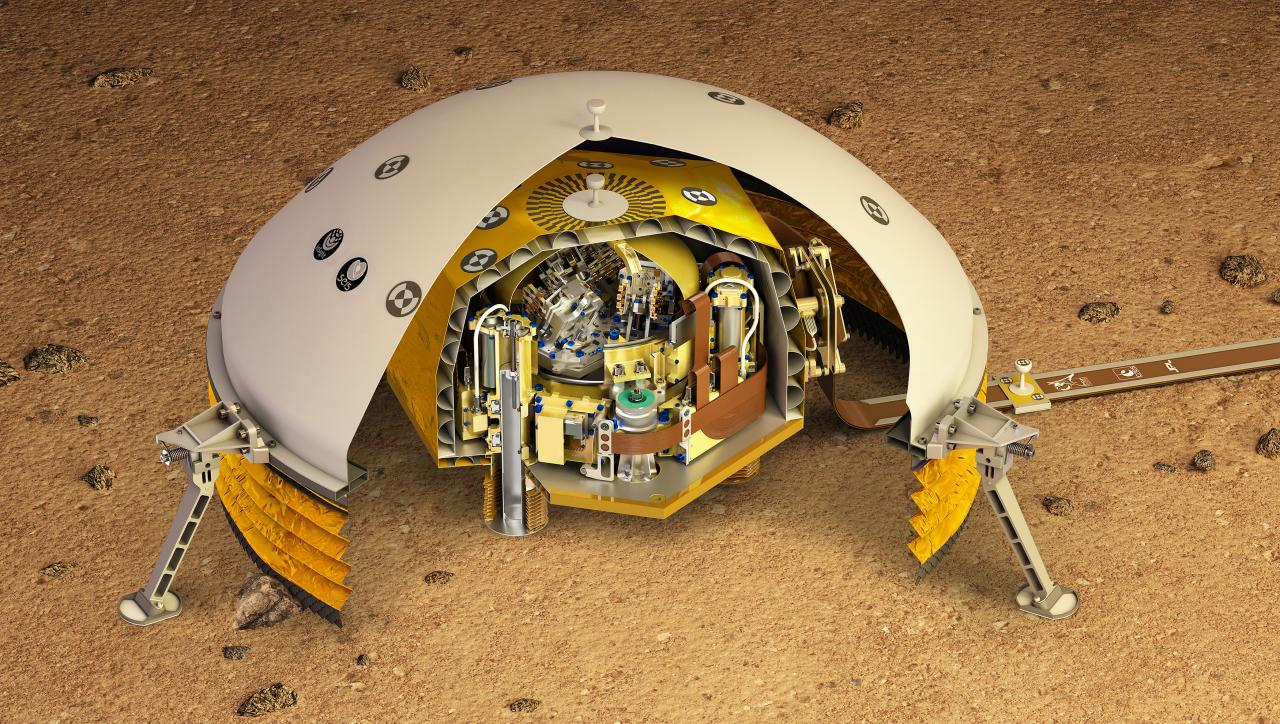
Cutaway illustration showing interior components of SEIS

== Placement on the surface ==
On 19 December 2018, the SEIS instrument was deployed to the surface of Mars next to the lander by its robotic arm.

InSight – seismometer deployed, first time onto the surface of another planet (19 December 2018)

context (ICC-gif)

deploying (IDC-gif)

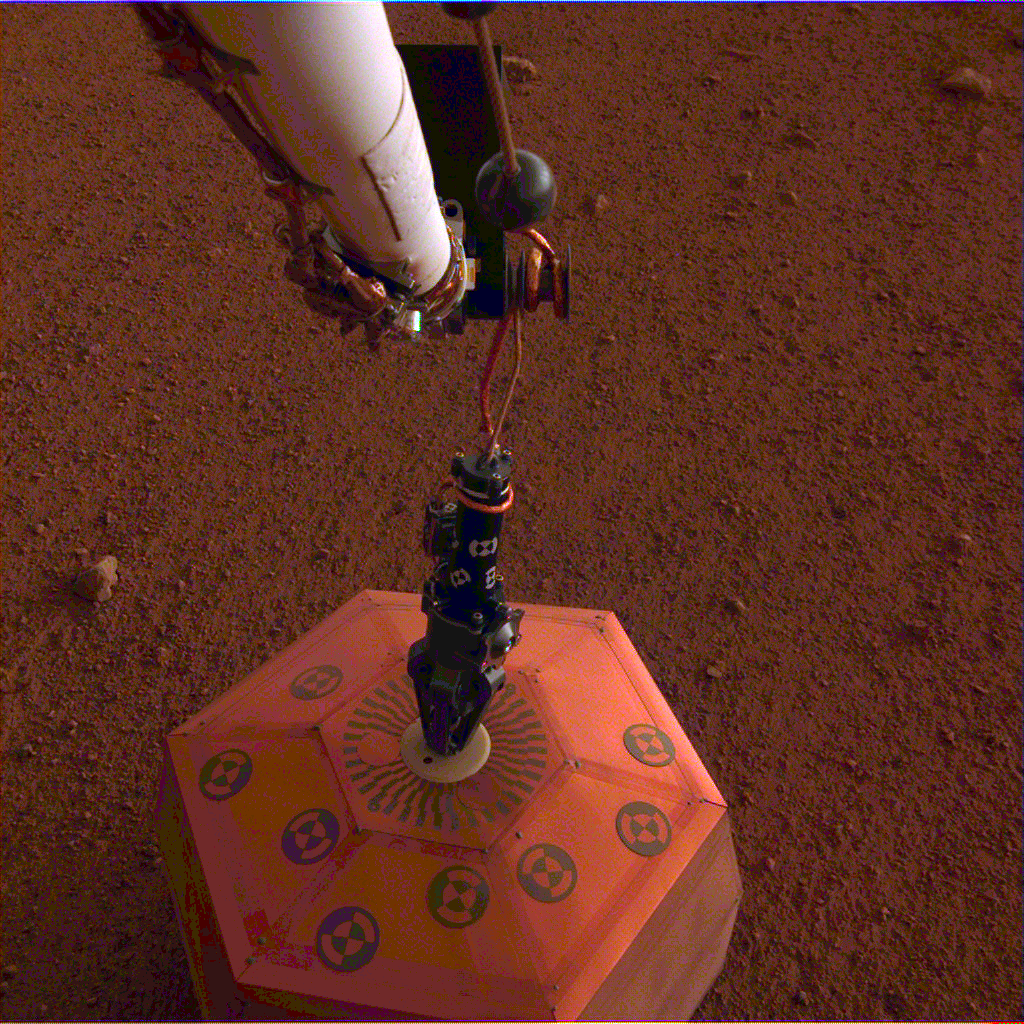
final (IDC)

== See also ==
- Composition of Mars
- Geology of Mars
- Volcanology of Mars
