= Heat Flow and Physical Properties Package =

Scientific instrument of the InSight Mars lander

Heat Flow and Physical Properties Package (HP^{3})
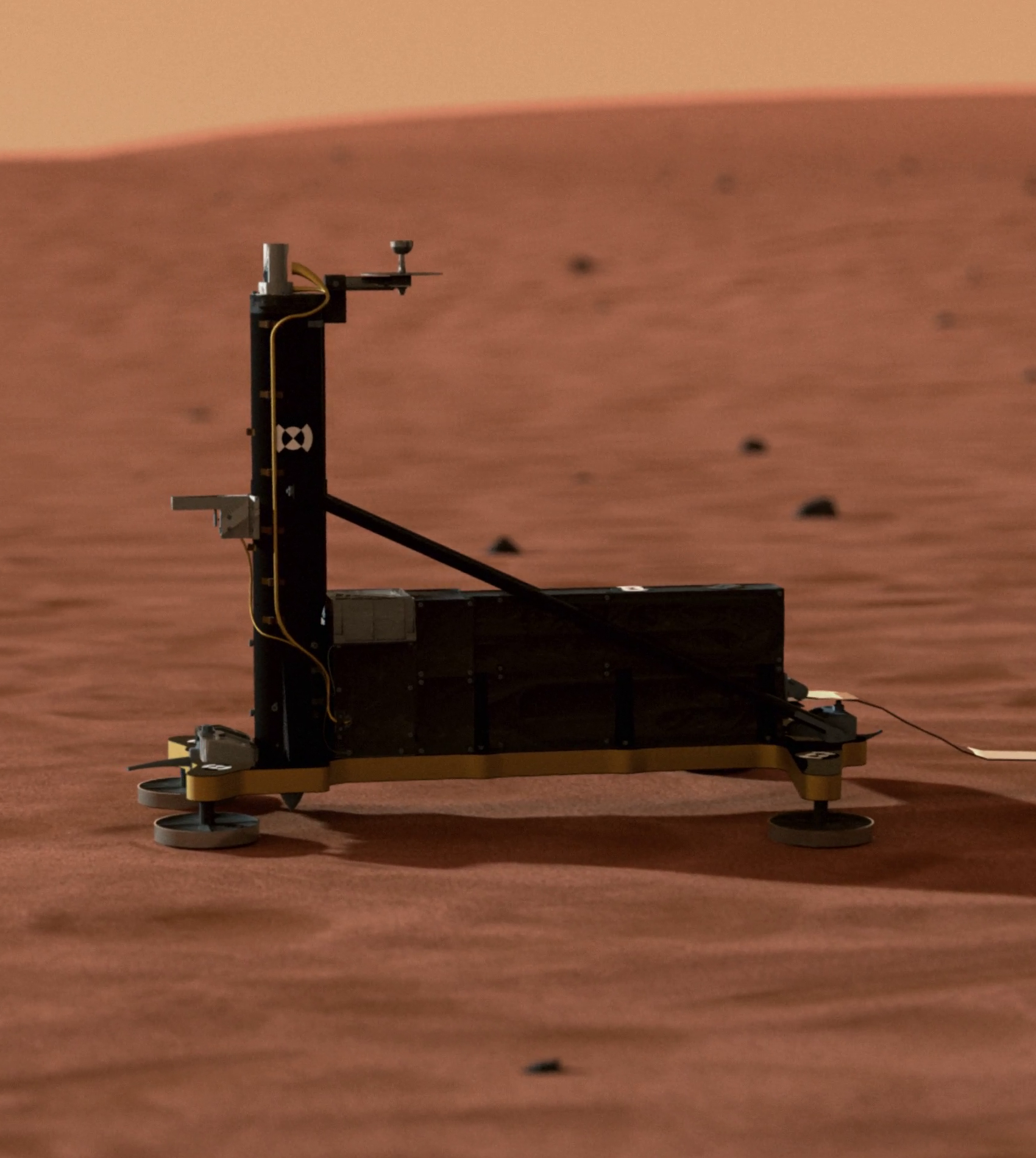
- Artist's impression of HP^{3} on the surface of Mars
- Operator: NASA
- Manufacturer: German Aerospace Center (DLR)
- Instrument type: infrared radiometer, thermal conductivity sensor
- Function: Geophysics of Mars
- Mission duration: 2 years on Mars (planned)
- Began operations: Landing: 26 November 2018
- Website: mars.nasa.gov/insight/mission/instruments/hp3/

Properties
- Mass: 3 kg (6.6 lb)
- Power consumption: 2 watts

Host spacecraft
- Spacecraft: InSight Mars lander
- Operator: NASA
- Launch date: 5 May 2018, 11:05 UTC
- Rocket: Atlas V 401
- Launch site: Vandenberg SLC-3E
- COSPAR ID: 2018-042A

The Heat Flow and Physical Properties Package (HP^{3}) is a science payload on board the InSight lander that features instruments to study the heat flow and other thermal properties of Mars. One of the instruments, a burrowing probe nicknamed "the mole", was designed to penetrate 5 m (16 ft) below Mars' surface. In March 2019, the mole burrowed a few centimeters, but then became unable to make progress due to various factors. In the following year further attempts were made to resolve the issues, with little net progress. On January 14, 2021, it was announced that efforts to drill into the martian surface using the device had been terminated.

HP^{3} was provided by the German Aerospace Center (DLR). The hammering mechanism inside the mole was designed by the Polish company Astronika and the Space Research Centre of the Polish Academy of Sciences under contract and in cooperation with DLR.

The Principal Investigator is Tilman Spohn from the German Aerospace Center.

== Overview ==
HP^{3} overview animation

The mission goal was to understand the origin and diversity of terrestrial planets. Information from the HP^{3} heat flow package was expected to reveal whether Mars and Earth formed from the same material, and determine how active the interior of Mars is today. Additional science goals included determining the thickness of Mars' crust, the composition of its mantle, and thermal characteristics of the interior, such as the temperature gradient and heat flux.

Together with the seismometer, the mission will estimate the size of Mars' core and whether the core is liquid or solid. The vibrations generated by the mole were monitored by SEIS to learn about the local subsurface.

In addition to the mole, HP^{3} includes an infrared radiometer (HP3-RAD) mounted to the landing platform, also contributed by DLR.

Diagram showing the components of HP^{3}

The HP^{3} heat flow probe is made up of the following subsystems:

- Support Structure (SS) a housing that includes:
  - Engineering tether (ET) to communicate between the support structure to the lander
  - Science tether (TEM-P) a flex PCB with 14 platinum RTDs for measuring thermal properties of the regolith.
  - Tether length monitor (TLM) optical length meter for measuring the deployed length of the science tether
- Infrared radiometer (HP3-RAD) for measuring surface temperature.
- Back end electronics (BEE) electronic control unit
- Mole penetrometer for burrowing beneath the surface
  - TEM-A active thermal conductivity sensor
  - STATIL tiltmeter for determining orientation and direction of the mole.

== Development ==
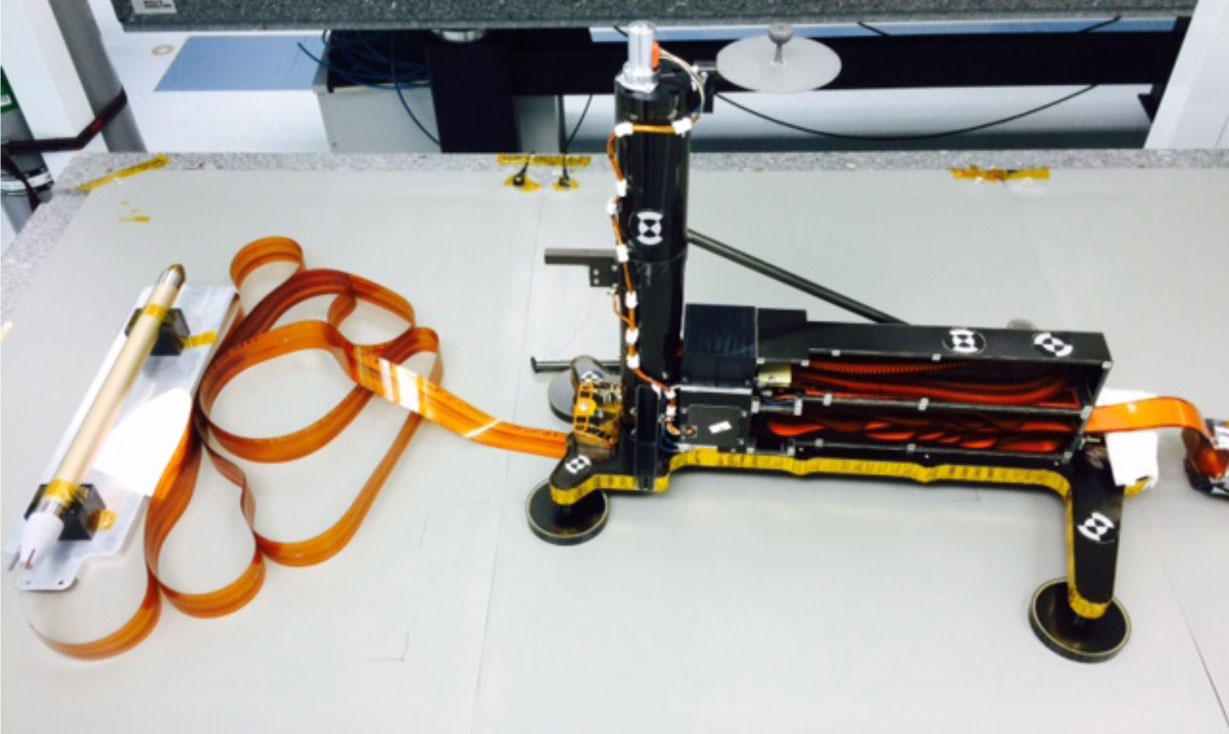
HP^{3} before launch. Left to right: mole, science tether, support structure, and engineering tether.

HP^{3} was conceived by Gromov V. V. et al. in 1997, and first flown as the PLUTO instrument on the failed 2003 Beagle 2 Mars lander mission. HP^{3} evolved further and it was proposed in 2001 for a mission to Mercury, in 2009 to the European Space Agency as part of the Humboldt payload on board the ExoMars lander, in 2010 for a mission to the Moon, and in 2011 it was proposed to NASA's Discovery Program as a payload for InSight Mars lander, known at that time as GEMS (Geophysical Monitoring Station). InSight was launched on 5 May 2018 and landed on 26 November 2018.

== Mole penetrometer ==
The mole is described as a "self-hammering nail" and was designed to burrow below the Martian surface while trailing a tether with embedded heaters and temperature sensors. The goal was to measure the thermal properties of Mars' interior, and thus reveal unique information about the planet's geologic history.

The burrowing mole is a pointed cylinder with a smooth outer surface approximately 35 cm (14 in) in length and 3.5 cm (1.4 in) in diameter. It contains a heater to determine thermal conductivity during descent, and it trails a tether equipped with precise heat sensors placed at 10 cm (3.9 in) intervals to measure the temperature profile of the subsurface.

The mole penetrator unit is designed to be placed near the lander in an area about 3-m long and 2-m wide. The total mass of the system is approximately 3 kg (6.6 lb) and it consumes a maximum of 2 watts while the mole is active.

For displacement, the mole uses a motor and a gearbox (provided by Maxon) and a cammed roller that periodically loads a spring connected to a rod that functions as a hammer. After release from the cam, the hammer accelerates downwards to hit the outer casing and cause its penetration through the regolith. Meanwhile, a suppressor mass travels upwards and its kinetic energy is compensated by gravitational potential and compression of a brake spring and wire helix on the opposite side of the mole.

In principle, every 50 cm (20 in) the probe puts out a pulse of heat and its sensors measure how the heat pulse changes with time. If the crust material is a thermal conductor, like metal, the pulse will decay quickly. The mole is first allowed to cool down for two days, then it is heated to about 10 °C (50 °F) over 24 hours. Temperature sensors within the tether measure how rapidly this happens, which tells scientists the thermal conductivity of the soil. Together, these measurements yield the rate of heat flowing from the interior.

The HP^{3} mole was originally expected to take about 40 days to reach 5 m (16 ft) deep, but ultimately achieved only a few centimeters after more than a year of effort. As the mole burrows, it generates vibrations that SEIS can detect, which were hoped to yield information about the Martian subsurface.

Animation of HP^{3} being deployed to the surface by InSight's robotic arm (IDA).

Animation of HP^{3} mole burrowing into Mars.

=== Penetration efforts ===
In March 2019, the HP^{3} began burrowing into the surface sand, but became stalled after several centimeters by what was initially suspected to be a large rock. Further analysis and testing with a replica model on Earth suggested the problem may be due to insufficient friction. In June 2019, more evidence for this was revealed when the support structure was lifted off of the HP^{3} mole. The Martian regolith appeared to be compressed, leaving a gap around the probe.

A technique was implemented using the lander's robotic arm to press on the soil near the probe to increase soil friction. Ultimately, this method was not able to generate enough downward force, since the HP^{3} probe was at the limit of the arm's range.

Instead, the team used the robotic scoop to pin the probe against the edge of its hole. This method appeared successful initially, as the probe continued to dig for two weeks, until it was flush with the surface. At this time, the exposed top of the probe was too small for the scoop to press against, so the scoop was re-positioned to press down on the soil near the probe. Unfortunately, this caused the probe to back out again due to unusual soil properties and low atmospheric pressure. As the probe bounced, loose soil filled the area beneath it and lifted the probe halfway out again. In January 2020, the team used the pinning method again, but once again the probe ejected after the scoop was repositioned.

In February 2020, the team reevaluated the risks of pushing the back cap of the mole directly using the robotic scoop, and determined the procedure to be acceptable. The procedure progressed slowly due to the requirement to reposition the scoop after each 1.5 cm of progress. In June 2020, the top of the mole reached the regolith surface. The mole entered the surface at an angle of 30 degrees from vertical, but this angle may decrease if a greater depth is reached.

In July 2020, it was revealed that the mole was bouncing in place, underneath the scoop, suggesting insufficient friction to continue digging. A proposed solution was to fill the hole with sand in order to distribute pressure from the robotic scoop, thereby increasing friction. This procedure was performed in early August 2020.

In late August 2020, a test indicated positive results. The scoop applied a downward force to the sand which covered the mole while hammering strokes were performed. This test resulted in a few millimeters of progress, and ultimately buried the instrument. In October 2020, the top of the mole was below the surface of Mars, and a decision was made to scrape two more scoops of regolith and tamp it down with the robotic scoop. Hammering operations were scheduled to continue in January 2021.

Final attempts to get the probe deeper took place on 9 January 2021; after they proved unsuccessful, the decision was made to stop attempting to dig deeper. On January 14, 2021, NASA announced that, as the final attempt to bury the "mole" had failed, the team had given up, with the heat probe portion of the mission declared to be over. The lead scientist for the experiment, Tilman Spohn, said that, "Mars and our heroic mole remain incompatible." The science team determined that the soil properties at the landing location were too different from what the instrument had been designed for. The team attempted many different remedies over several years to get the mole burrowing, but ultimately the attempts did not reach the target depth. The friction between the soil and the probe was not enough for the mole to hammer itself deeper.

The mole did achieve complete burial; the top of the mole is 2 to 3 centimetres below the Martian surface (with the mole itself being about 40 centimetres in length, the depth was thus about 43 centimetres). To be able to produce useful thermal measurements, the minimum required depth was specified as at least 3 metres deep.

Although unsuccessful, the mole's operations did teach the mission team a lot about the soil at the Insight site, about conducting excavation/drilling on Mars, and about operating the lander's robotic arm. The mole-rescue effort used the arm in ways that were unplanned before the mission. The seismometer (SEIS), radio experiment (RISE) and the weather instruments (TWINS) continued to operate until the end of December 2022.

Efforts of HP^{3} to penetrate the Martian surface
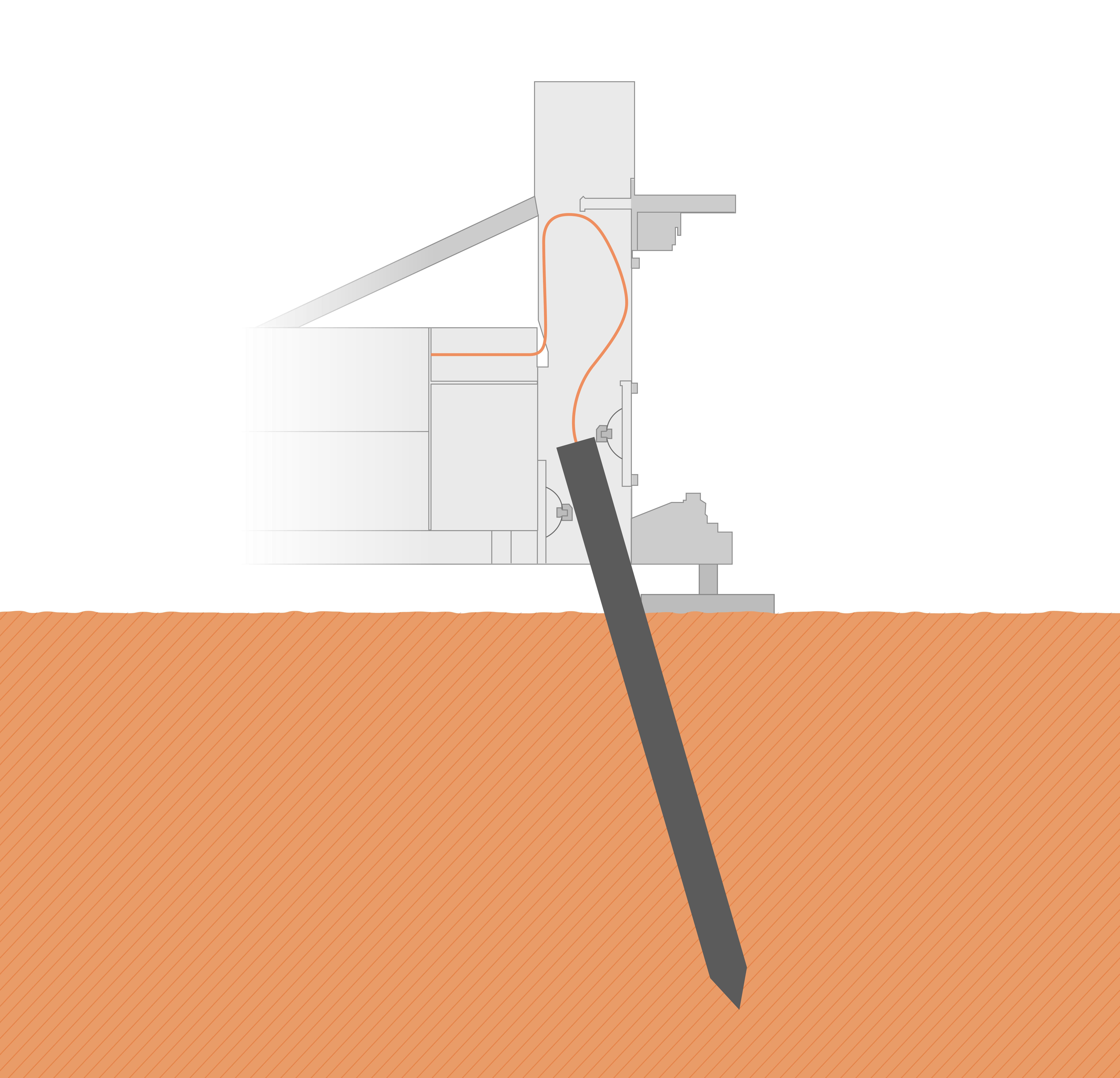
Engineering analysis of the mole after the initial problem concluded that the bottom of the mole was about 12–14 inches (30–36 cm) deep into Martian ground, with a bit of its top still inside the HP^{3} support structure.

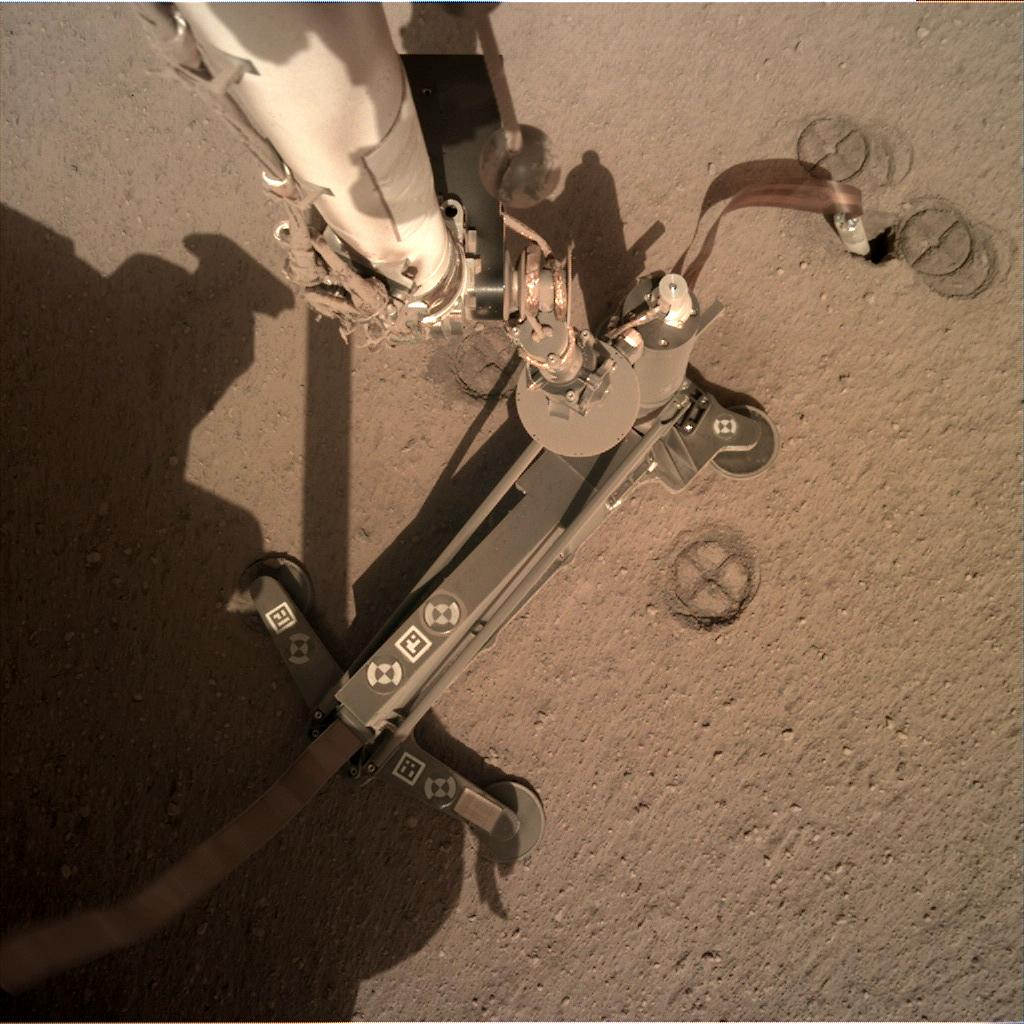
Insight's HP^{3} components after lifting the support structure away from the mole. This image shows a region of compressed regolith around the Mole penetrometer.

The initial success of the pinning technique is depicted in this time lapse video, which shows the probe burrowing into the regolith.

HP^{3} is seen after backing about halfway out of the hole it had burrowed.

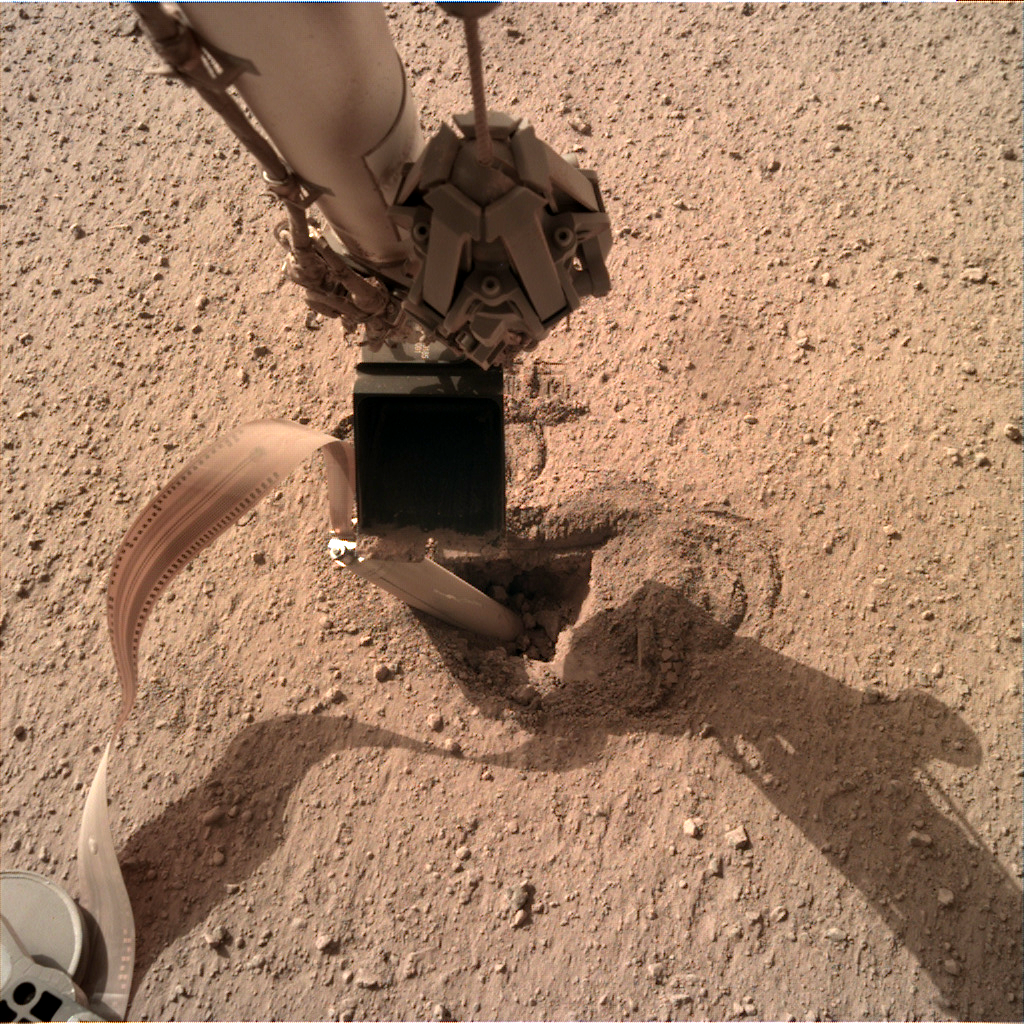
Insight lander using its scoop to push on the back cap of the HP^{3} mole.

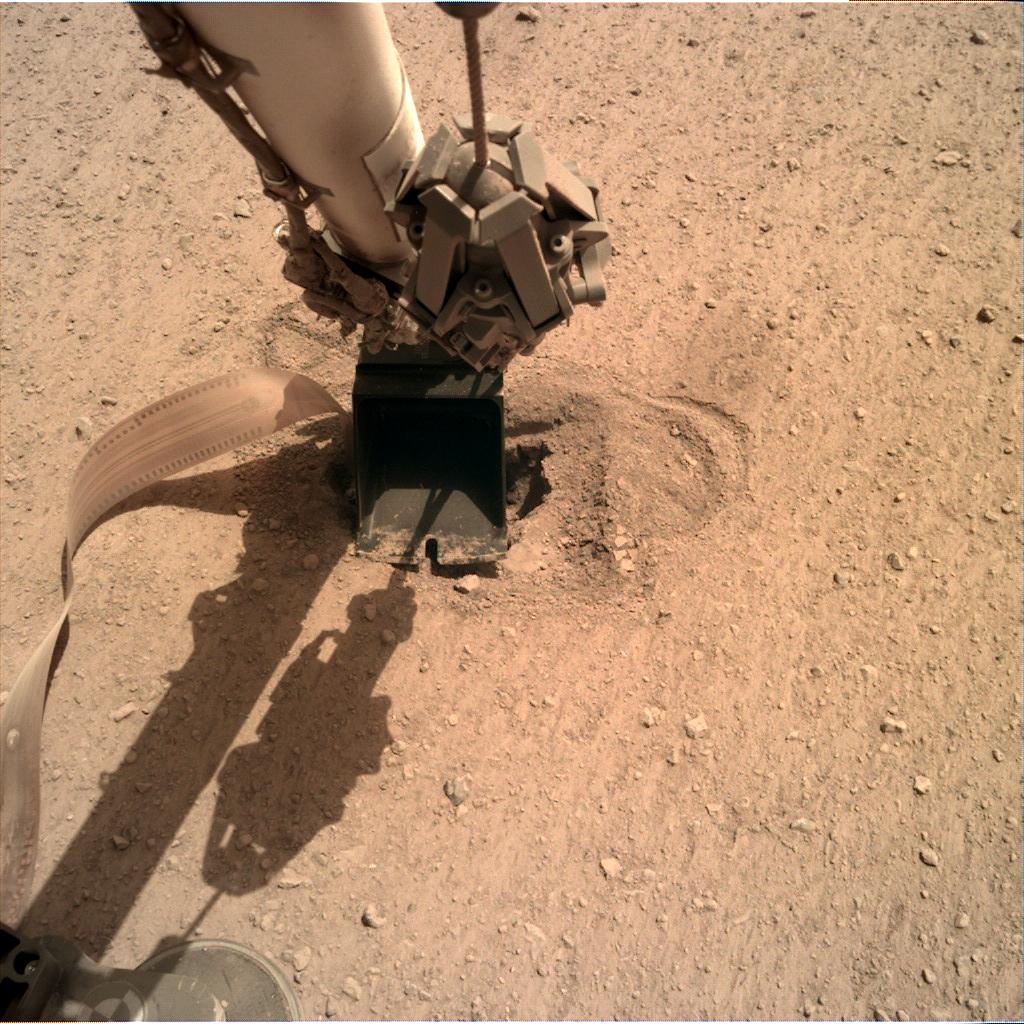
HP^{3} mole at the surface of Mars, with the lander scoop pressing on its back cap.

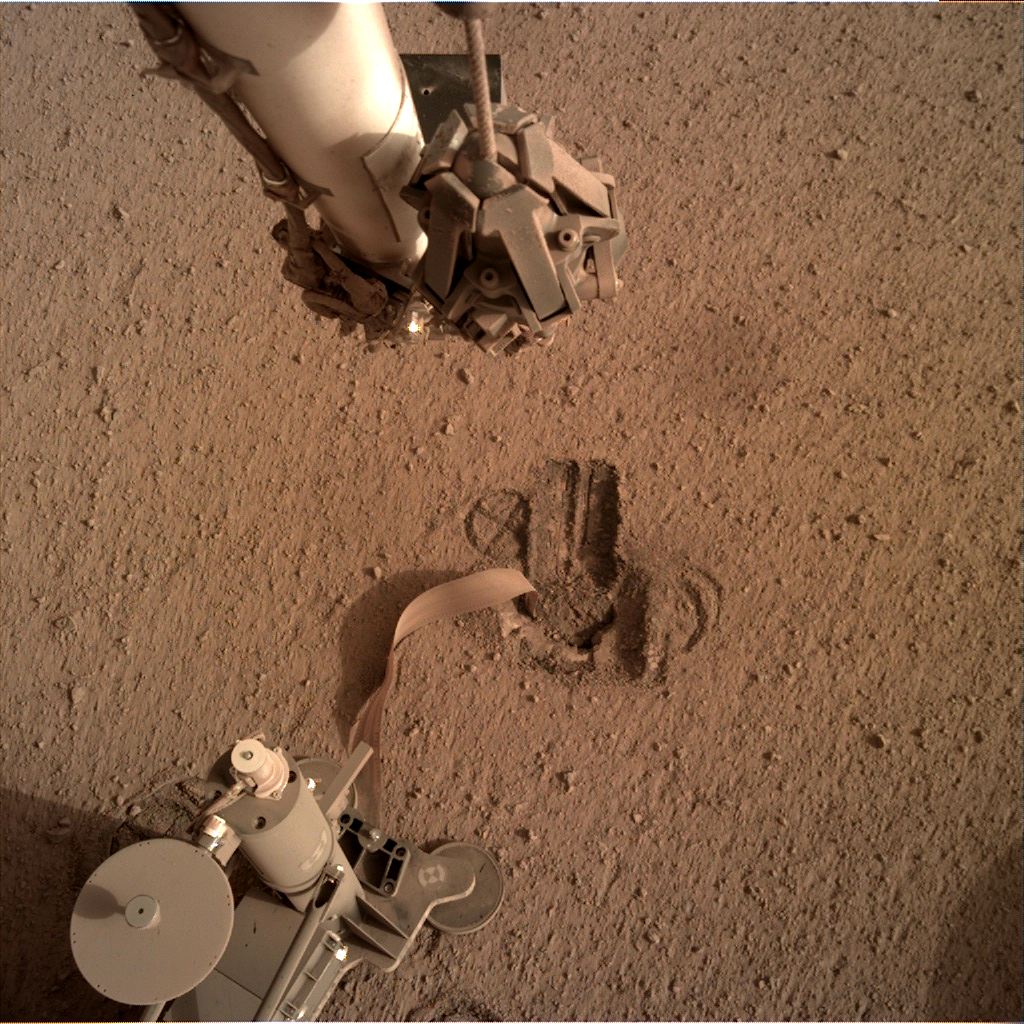
The mole, after being covered with sand by the robotic scoop

Mars InSight Lander - "Mole" - Final Efforts
(9 January 2021)

== HP3-RAD Infrared Radiometer ==
The HP^{3} includes an infrared radiometer for measuring surface temperatures, contributed by DLR and based on the MARA radiometer for the Hayabusa2 mission. HP3-RAD uses thermopile detectors to measure three spectral bands: 8–14 μm, 16–19 μm and 7.8–9.6 μm. HP3-RAD has a mass of 120 g (4.2 oz).

The detector was protected by a removable cover during landing. The cover also serves as a calibration target for the instrument, supporting on-site calibration of the HP3-RAD.

Infrared radiometers were sent to Mars in 1969 as one of four major instruments on the Mariner 6 and Mariner 7 flyby spacecraft, and the observations helped to trigger a scientific revolution in knowledge about Mars. The Mariner 6 & 7 infrared radiometer results showed that the atmosphere of Mars is composed mostly of carbon dioxide (CO_{2}), and revealed trace amounts water on the surface of Mars.

== See also ==
- Mini-TES, an infrared instrument on the 2003 Mars Exploration Rovers
