= HP =

HP may refer to:

== Arts and entertainment ==
- Harry Potter, a novel series by J. K. Rowling
- Hello Project (H!P), a J-pop idol brand under Japanese music company Up-Front Group
- Horse-Power: Ballet Symphony, a 1932 ballet composed by Carlos Chávez
- Hot Package, a TV show created by Adult Swim
- HP: To the Highest Level Na!, a 2005 Philippine TV sitcom
- "HP" (song), a 2019 song by Maluma

== Businesses and organisations ==
- Hewlett-Packard, an American technology company founded in 1939 and split in 2015
  - HP Inc., the descendant company formed in 2015 from the split, focusing on PCs and printing
  - Hewlett Packard Enterprise, a new company created as a result of the split in 2015, focusing on corporate systems
- HP Foods, British food products company
- Handley Page, an aircraft company
- Hindustan Petroleum, Indian petroleum company, subsidiary of Oil and Natural Gas Corporation
- America West Airlines (1981–2006), an American airline (IATA code HP)
- Amapola Flyg (2004–present), a Swedish airline (IATA code HP)
- HP Books, an imprint of the Penguin Group
- Populist Party (Turkey) (Halkçı Parti), a political party in Turkey between 1983 and 1985

== Brands and products ==
- Aero Adventure Aventura HP, an ultralight amphibian aircraft
- China Railways HP, heavy freight train steam locomotive
- HP (car), a British 1920s three-wheeled cyclecar made by Hilton-Peacey
- HP Sauce, British sauce named after Houses of Parliament
- Hy-Tek HP, a single-engined high-wing trike aircraft
- Ilford HP, cubic-grained black-and-white photographic film series, and photographic film prefix
- Walther HP, a semi-automatic pistol

== Places ==
- Harrison Plaza, a shopping mall in the Philippines that closed down in 2019
- Heart Peaks, a volcano in Canada
- Himachal Pradesh, a state in India
- High Point, North Carolina, United States
- HP postcode area, a group of postcode districts in England

== People and characters ==
- Hadi Prabowo (born 1960), Indonesian politician
- Hal Porter (1911–1984), Australian author
- Harry Pearson (audio critic) (1937–2014), American audio critic
- Harry Potter (character), a fictional character and protagonist in the series of the same name

== Science, engineering, technology ==
- Horsepower (hp), a unit of power
- Haptoglobin, a protein
- Hypersensitivity pneumonitis, a respiratory inflammation
- High precipitation supercell, a thunderstorm classification
- Hilbert polynomial of a graded algebra
- Horizontal pitch unit, used to specify rack-mounted equipment width
- Heat pump, a machine that transfers thermal energy between spaces
- H/P, hacking/phreaking

== Other uses ==
- Half-pay, former UK pay for military personnel not on active service
- Higher Power, a concept in Alcoholics Anonymous and in similar twelve-step organisations
- Hire purchase, a type of sales-instalment plan
- Hit points or health points in video games, often used in role-playing genre culture.
- Hollow-point bullet, a type of round
- Home page, the main page of a website
- Howiesons Poort, a stone-age technology period in Africa
- Haltepunkt, German for "railway halt"

== See also ==
- HP Garage, museum of Hewlett-Packard's history
- H&P (disambiguation)
- HPS (disambiguation)
