= HPSS =

HPSS may refer to:

- High Performance Storage System, a hierarchical storage management product
- High performing specialist school, a type of specialist school in the UK
- ATI HPSS (Acoustic Technology Inc. High-Power Speaker Station), an outdoor speaker system used as a warning siren
- Health and Population Sector Strategy, for health in Bangladesh by its government
- Croatian Peoples' Peasant Party (Croatian: HPSS), predecessor of the Croatian Peasant Party

== See also ==
- HPS (disambiguation)
