= H&P =

H&P may refer to:

- History & Physical in medicine, comprising
  - Medical history
  - Physical examination
- Helmerich & Payne, an American petroleum services company
- Henley & Partners, a British investment consultancy
- Henke & Pillot, an American supermarket chain

== See also ==
- HP (disambiguation)
