= Mariner 6 and 7 =

Twin NASA flyby missions to Mars (1969–1970)

Mariner 6
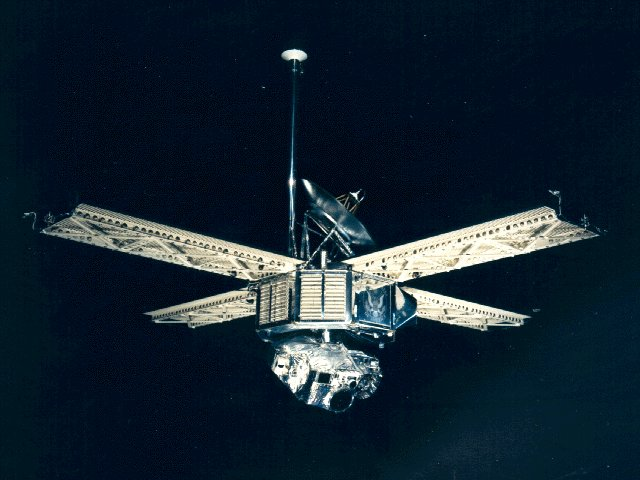
- Mariner 6 and 7
- Mission type: Mars flyby
- Operator: NASA / JPL
- COSPAR ID: 1969-014A
- SATCAT no.: 3759
- Mission duration: 1 year, 9 months and 28 days

Spacecraft properties
- Spacecraft: Mariner-F
- Manufacturer: Jet Propulsion Laboratory
- Launch mass: 381 kg
- Power: 449 W

Start of mission
- Launch date: February 25, 1969, 01:29:02 UTC
- Rocket: Atlas SLV-3D Centaur-D1A
- Launch site: Cape Canaveral LC-36B

End of mission
- Disposal: Decommissioned
- Deactivated: December 23, 1970

Flyby of Mars
- Closest approach: July 31, 1969
- Distance: 3,431 kilometers (2,132 mi)

Mariner 7
- Mission type: Mars flyby
- Operator: NASA / JPL
- COSPAR ID: 1969-030A
- SATCAT no.: 3837
- Mission duration: 1 year, 9 months and 1 day

Spacecraft properties
- Spacecraft: Mariner-G
- Manufacturer: Jet Propulsion Laboratory
- Launch mass: 381 kg
- Power: 449 W

Start of mission
- Launch date: March 27, 1969, 22:22:00 UTC
- Rocket: Atlas SLV-3D Centaur-D1A
- Launch site: Cape Canaveral LC-36A

End of mission
- Disposal: Decommissioned
- Deactivated: December 28, 1970

Flyby of Mars
- Closest approach: August 5, 1969
- Distance: 3,430 kilometers (2,130 mi)

Mariner 6 and Mariner 7 (Mariner Mars 69A and Mariner Mars 69B) were two uncrewed NASA robotic spacecraft that completed the first dual mission to Mars in 1969 as part of NASA's wider Mariner program. Mariner 6 was launched from Launch Complex 36B at Cape Canaveral Air Force Station and Mariner 7 from Launch Complex 36A. The two craft flew over the equator and south polar regions, analyzing the atmosphere and the surface with remote sensors, and recording and relaying hundreds of pictures. The mission's goals were to study the surface and atmosphere of Mars during close flybys, in order to establish the basis for future investigations, particularly those relevant to the search for extraterrestrial life, and to demonstrate and develop technologies required for future Mars missions. Mariner 6 also had the objective of providing experience and data which would be useful in programming the Mariner 7 encounter five days later.

== Launch ==
Three Mariner probes were constructed for the mission, with two intended to fly and one as a spare in the event of a mission failure. The spacecraft were shipped to Cape Canaveral with their Atlas-Centaur boosters in December 1968 – January 1969 to begin pre-launch checkouts and testing. On February 14, Mariner 6 was undergoing a simulated countdown on LC-36A, electrical power running, but no propellant loaded in the booster. During the test run, an electrical relay in the Atlas malfunctioned and opened two valves in the pneumatic system which allowed helium pressure gas to escape from the booster's balloon skin. The Atlas began to crumple over, however two pad technicians quickly activated a manual override switch to close the valves and pump helium back in. Although Mariner 6 and its Centaur stage had been saved, the Atlas had sustained structural damage and could not be reused, so they were removed from the booster and placed atop Mariner 7's launch vehicle on the adjacent LC-36B, while a different Atlas was used for Mariner 7.

NASA awarded the quick-thinking technicians, Bill McClure and Charles 'Jack' Beverlin, Exceptional Bravery Medals for their courage in risking being crushed underneath the 124-foot (38 m) rocket. In 2014, an escarpment on Mars which NASA'S Opportunity rover had recently visited was named the McClure-Beverlin Ridge in honor of the pair, who had since died.

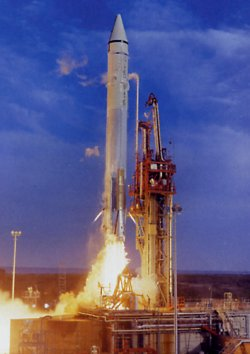
Mariner 7 lift-off on March 27, 1969

Mariner 6 lifted off from LC-36B at Cape Canaveral on February 25, 1969, using the Atlas-Centaur AC-20 rocket, while Mariner 7 lifted off from LC-36A on March 27, using the Atlas-Centaur AC-19 rocket. The boost phase for both spacecraft went according to plan and no serious anomalies occurred with either launch vehicle. A minor LOX leak froze some telemetry probes in AC-20 which registered as a drop in sustainer engine fuel pressure; however, the engine performed normally through powered flight. In addition, BECO occurred a few seconds early due to a faulty cutoff switch, resulting in longer than intended burn time of the sustainer engine, but this had no serious effect on vehicle performance or the flight path. AC-20 was launched at a 108-degree azimuth.

The Centaur stage on both flights was set up to perform a retrorocket maneuver after capsule separation. This served two purposes, firstly to prevent venting propellant from the spent Centaur from contacting the probe, secondly to put the vehicle on a trajectory that would send it into solar orbit and not impact the Martian surface, potentially contaminating the planet with Earth microbes.

== Spaceflight ==
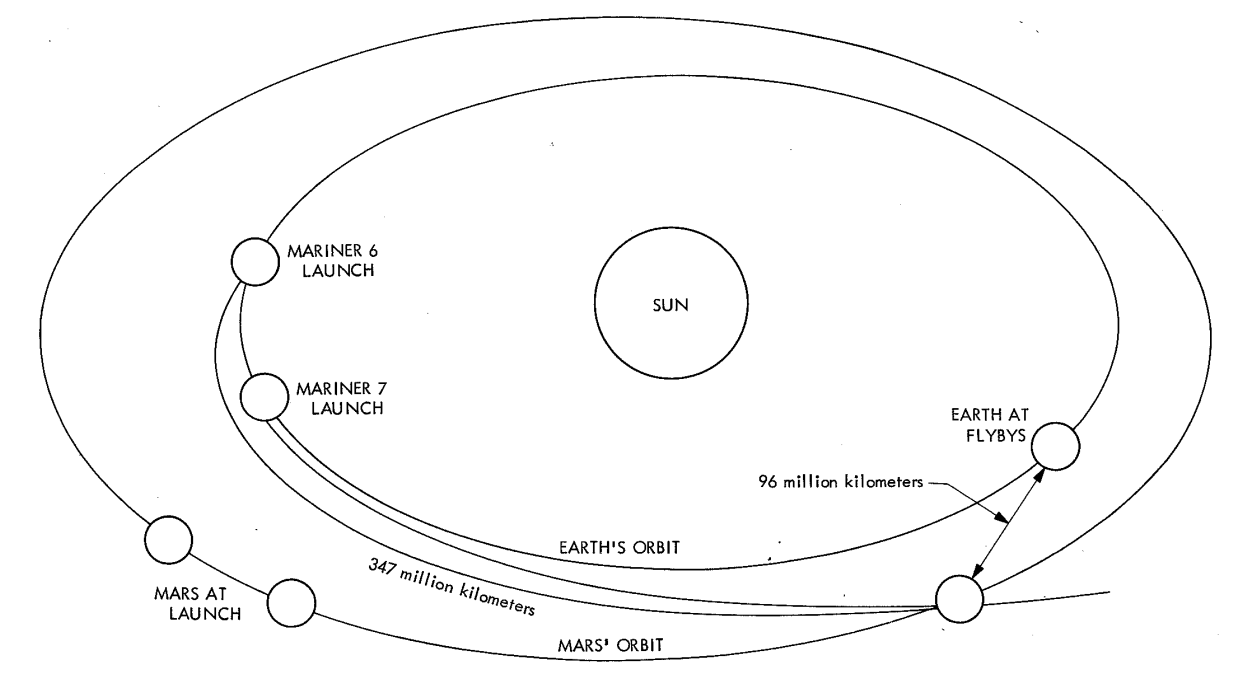
Mariners 6 and 7 both followed a long solar orbit that carried them gradually to Mars

On July 29, 1969, less than a week before closest approach, Jet Propulsion Laboratory (JPL) lost contact with Mariner 7. The center regained the signal via the backup low-gain antenna and regained use of the high gain antenna again shortly after Mariner 6's close encounter. Leaking gases from a battery (which later failed) were thought to have caused the anomaly. Based on the observations that Mariner 6 made, Mariner 7 was reprogrammed in flight to take further observations of areas of interest and actually returned more pictures than Mariner 6, despite the battery's failure.

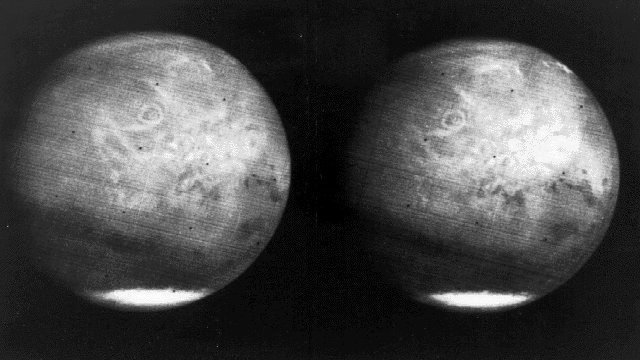
Two full disc views of Mars from Mariner 7 as it approached, 1969

Closest approach for Mariner 6 occurred July 31, 1969, at 05:19:07 UT at a distance of 3,431 kilometers (2,132 mi) above the martian surface. Closest approach for Mariner 7 occurred August 5, 1969 at 05:00:49 UT at a distance of 3,430 kilometers (2,130 mi) above the Martian surface. This was less than half of the distance used by Mariner 4 on the previous US Mars flyby mission.

Both spacecraft are now defunct and in heliocentric orbits.

=== Science data and findings ===
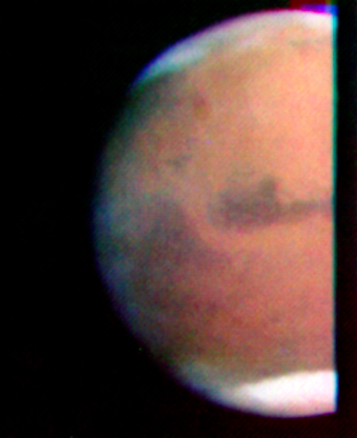
Mariner 7 far encounter color composite, created using Red, Green and Blue filter images

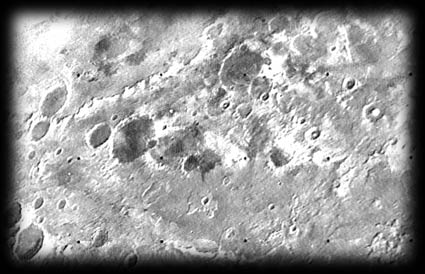
A close-up of the surface of Mars taken by Mariner 7

By chance, both spacecraft flew over cratered regions and missed both the giant northern volcanoes and the equatorial grand canyon discovered later. Their approach pictures did, however, photograph about 20 percent of the planet's surface, showing the dark features long seen from Earth – in the past, these features had been mistaken for canals by some ground-based astronomers.

When Mariner 7 flew over the Martian south pole on August 4, 1969, it sent back pictures of ice-filled craters and outlines of the south polar cap. Despite the communication defect suffered by Mariner 7 earlier, these pictures were of better quality than what had been sent by its twin, Mariner 6, a few days earlier when it flew past the Martian equator. In total, 201 photos were taken and transmitted back to Earth, adding more detail than the earlier mission, Mariner 4. Both probes also studied the atmosphere of Mars.

Coming a week after Apollo 11, Mariner 6 and 7's flyby of Mars received less than the normal amount of media coverage for a mission of this significance.

The engineering model of Mariners 6 and 7 still exists, and is owned by the Jet Propulsion Laboratory (JPL). It is on loan to LASP, and is on display in the lab's lobby.

Mariner 6 and 7 infrared radiometer observations helped to trigger a scientific revolution in Mars knowledge. The Mariner 6 and 7 infrared radiometer results showed that the atmosphere of Mars is composed mostly of carbon dioxide (CO_{2}), and they were also able to detect trace amounts of water on the surface of Mars.

== Spacecraft and subsystems ==
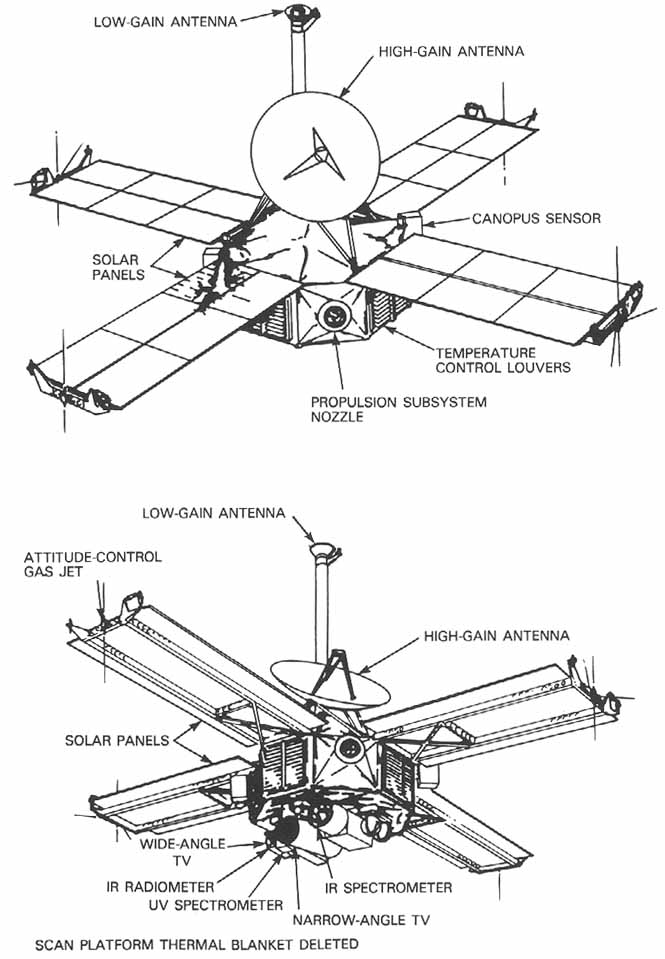
Spacecraft and subsystems

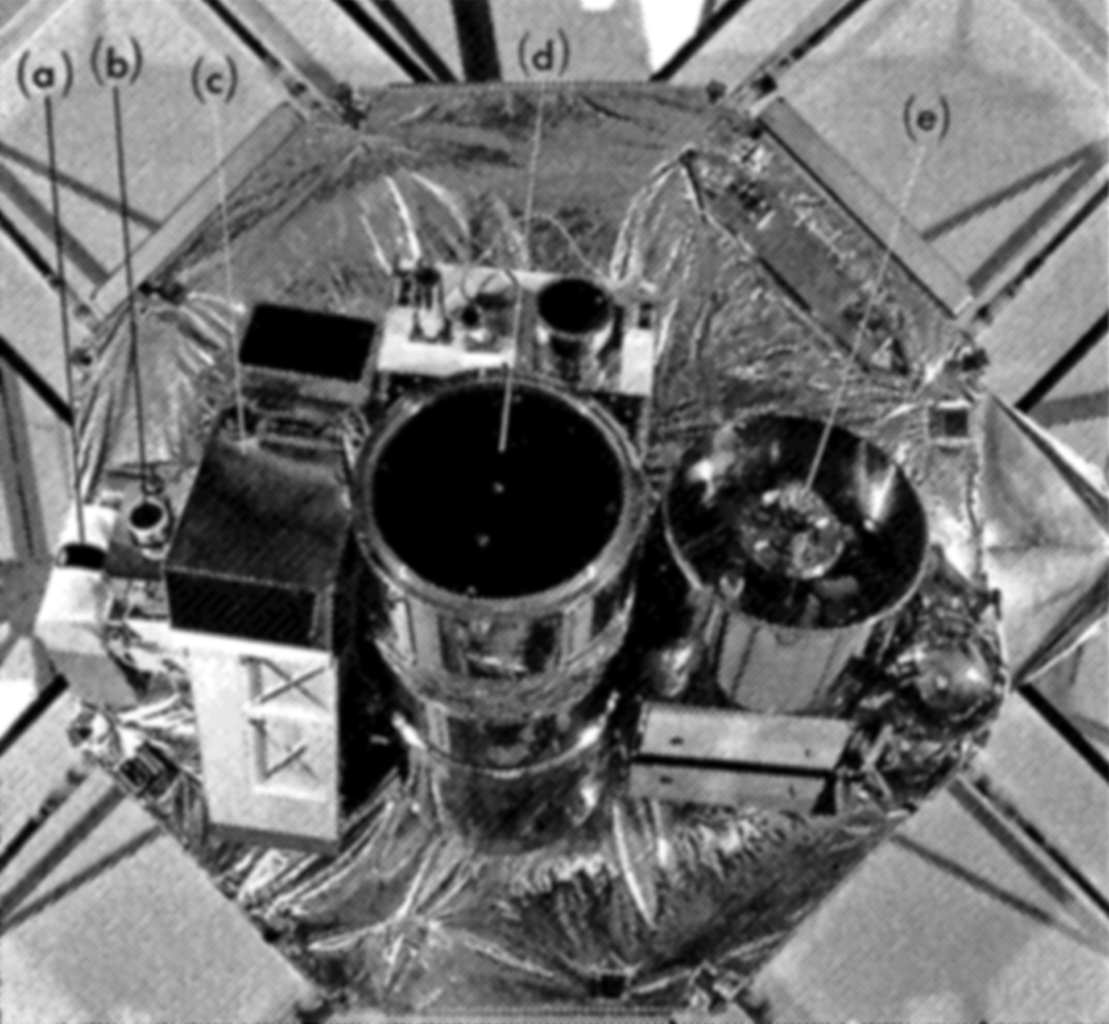
Two-axis scan platform holding scientific instruments

The Mariner 6 and 7 spacecraft were identical, consisting of an octagonal magnesium frame base, 138.4 cm (54.5 in) diagonally and 45.7 cm (18.0 in) deep. A conical superstructure mounted on top of the frame held the high-gain 1 metre (3 ft 3 in) diameter parabolic antenna and four solar panels, each measuring 215 cm (85 in) x 90 cm (35 in), were affixed to the top corners of the frame. The tip-to-tip span of the deployed solar panels was 5.79 m (19.0 ft). A low-gain omnidirectional antenna was mounted on a 2.23 m (7 ft 4 in) high mast next to the high-gain antenna. Underneath the octagonal frame was a two-axis scan platform which held scientific instruments. Overall science instrument mass was 57.6 kg (127 lb). The total height of the spacecraft was 3.35 m (11.0 ft).

The spacecraft was attitude stabilized in three axes, referenced to the Sun and the star Canopus. It utilized 3 gyros, 2 sets of 6 nitrogen jets, which were mounted on the ends of the solar panels, a Canopus tracker, and two primary and four secondary Sun sensors. Propulsion was provided by a 223-newton rocket motor, mounted within the frame, which used the mono-propellant hydrazine. The nozzle, with 4-jet vane vector control, protruded from one wall of the octagonal structure. Power was supplied by 17,472 photovoltaic cells, covering an area of 7.7 square meters (83 sq ft) on the four solar panels. These could provide 800 watts of power near Earth, and 449 watts while near Mars. The maximum power requirement was 380 watts, once Mars was reached. A 1200 watt-hour, rechargeable, silver-zinc battery was used to provide backup power. Thermal control was achieved through the use of adjustable louvers on the sides of the main compartment.

Three telemetry channels were available for telecommunications. Channel A carried engineering data at 8 1/3 or 33 1/3 bit/s, channel B carried scientific data at 66 2/3 or 270 bit/s and channel C carried science data at 16,200 bit/s. Communications were accomplished through the high- and low-gain antennas, via dual S-band traveling wave tube amplifiers, operating at 10 or 20 watts, for transmission. The design also included a single receiver. An analog tape recorder, with a capacity of 195 million bits, could store television images for subsequent transmission. Other science data was stored on a digital recorder. The command system, consisting of a central computer and sequencer (CC&S), was designed to actuate specific events at precise times. The CC&S was programmed with both a standard mission and a conservative backup mission before launch, but could be commanded and reprogrammed in flight. It could perform 53 direct commands, 5 control commands, and 4 quantitative commands.

=== Scientific Instruments ===
Both spacecraft carried the same set of instruments:

==== Imaging System (Wide & Narrow-Angle TV Cameras) ====
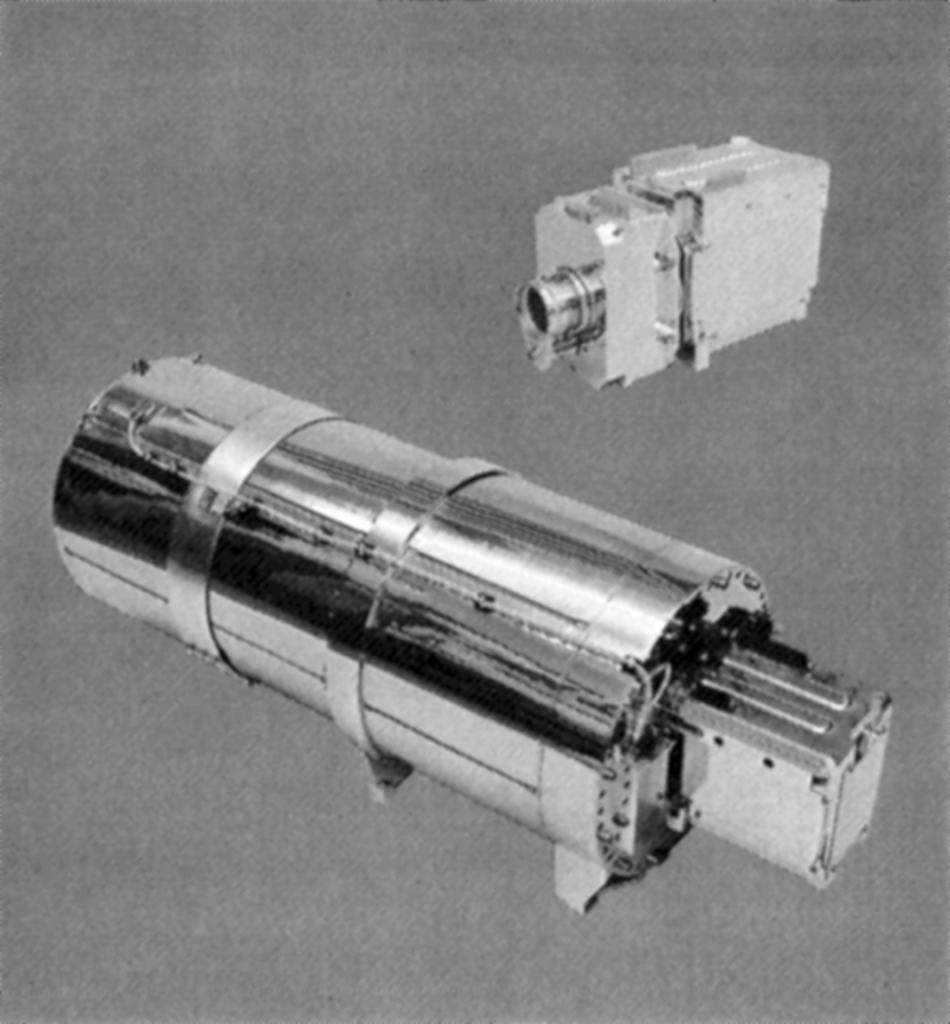
Imaging System Wide & Narrow-Angle TV Cameras

Each Mariner carried a dual television camera system consisting of a wide-angle and a narrow-angle vidicon camera. The TV images were stored onboard on tape recorders and transmitted back to Earth.

The following table summarizes characteristics of both cameras:

Imaging System camera details
Camera	Filter	Peak (nm)	Bandwidth (nm)	Bit depth	Resolution	F-number	Focal length
Mariner 6 Wide-Angle	Red	560	540-590	8 bits	945x704	5.6	52.5 mm
Mariner 6 Wide-Angle	Green	520	510-560	8 bits	945x704	5.6	52.5 mm
Mariner 6 Wide-Angle	Blue	440	440-480	8 bits	945x704	5.6	52.5 mm
Mariner 7 Wide-Angle	Red	580	550-590	8 bits	945x704	5.6	52.5 mm
Mariner 7 Wide-Angle	Green	520	500-550	8 bits	945x704	5.6	52.5 mm
Mariner 7 Wide-Angle	Blue	445	440-480	8 bits	945x704	5.6	52.5 mm
Mariner 6 Narrow-Angle	Minus Blue			8 bits	945x704	2.4	504 mm
Mariner 7 Narrow-Angle	Minus Blue			8 bits	945x704	2.4	504 mm

==== Infrared Spectrometer ====
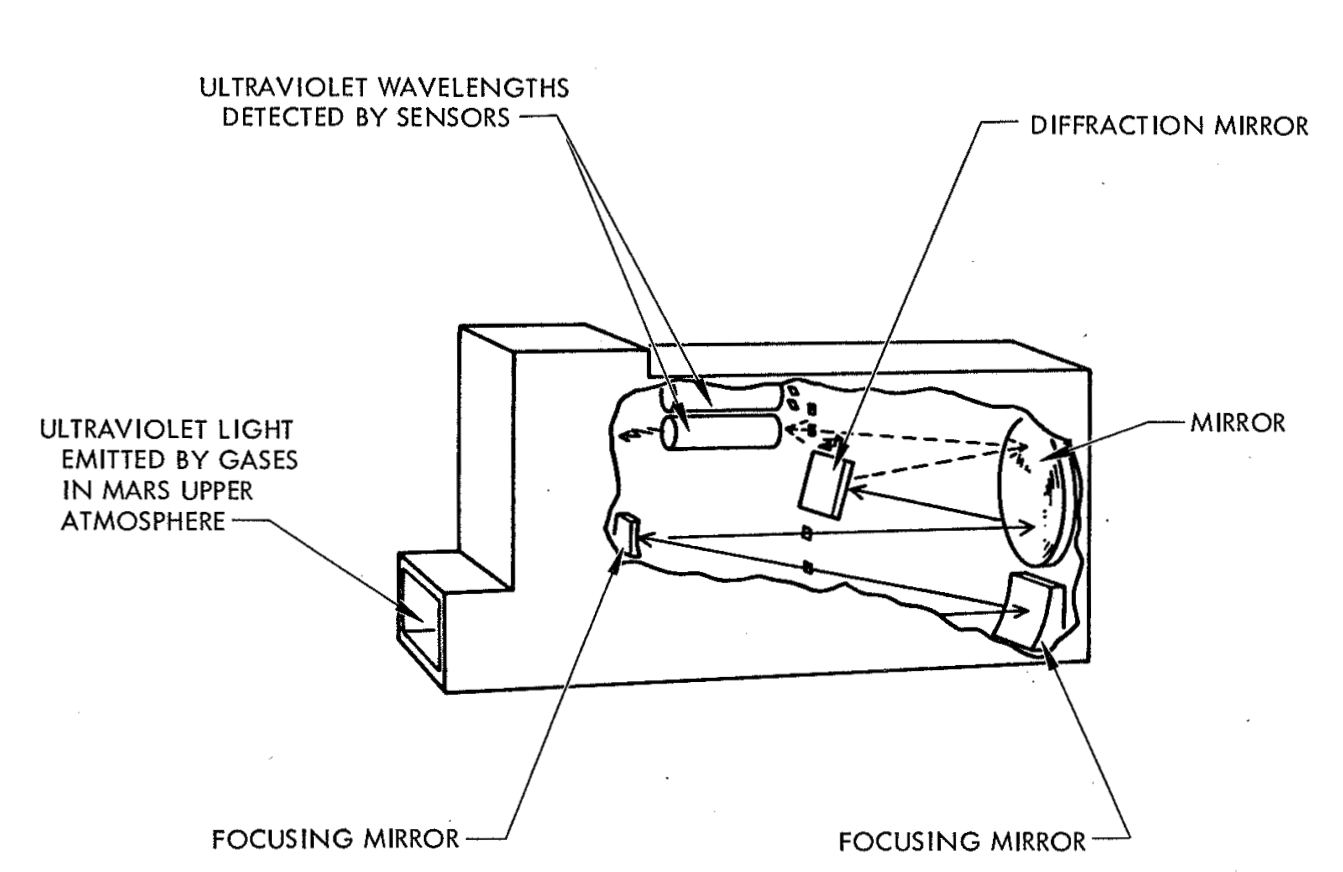
Ultraviolet Spectrometer diagram

The Infrared Spectrometer scanned infrared wavelengths to detect signatures of atmospheric gases and surface materials. It used multiple spectral channels to measure emission and reflection in the 1.9 to 14.3 μm range.

==== Ultraviolet Spectrometer ====
The Ultraviolet Spectrometer (UVS), built by the University of Colorado Laboratory for Atmospheric and Space Physics (LASP), measured ultraviolet emission spectra between 110 nm to 340 nm from Mars' upper atmosphere to determine its composition and structure.

==== Infrared Radiometer ====
The Infrared Radiometer measured thermal infrared radiation using multiple spectral channels. It consisted of two 1 in (25 mm) telescopes, one covering the wavelength range of 8.1 μm to 12.5 μm and the other the range of 17.9 μm to 25.1 μm.

==== Celestial Mechanics Experiment ====
The Celestial Mechanics experiment used Doppler shifts from the spacecraft's radio signal to refine knowledge of Mars' gravitational field, orbital parameters, and spacecraft trajectory.

==== S-Band Occultation Experiment ====
This experiment used the spacecraft's S-band radio signal as it passed behind Mars (occultation) to probe the Martian atmosphere.

==== Conical Radiometer ====
This instrument measured incoming thermal radiation from the environment and helped characterize the spacecraft's thermal conditions in flight.

== See also ==
- List of missions to Mars
- Space exploration
- Uncrewed space missions
- Heat Flow and Physical Properties Package (included an infrared radiometer for the Martian surface)
