= HP (car) =

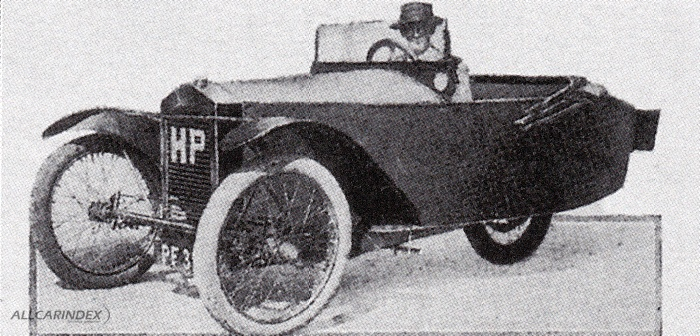
- HP car in 1927.

Overview
- Manufacturer: Hilton-Peacey Motors
- Production: 1926–1928

Body and chassis
- Class: cyclecar
- Body style: open two-seat

Powertrain
- Engine: JAP single-cylinder
- Transmission: chain drive

Dimensions
- Wheelbase: 78 in (1,981 mm)

Chronology
- Successor: none

The HP was a British three-wheeled cyclecar made from 1926 until 1928 by Hilton-Peacey (possibly Pacey) Motors of Woking, Surrey.

Most cars used an air-cooled 500 cc single-cylinder JAP engine but one had a larger 600 cc version and another two 500 cc Dunelt 2 strokes and three 500 cc Vulpine overhead valve engines. The drive was by chain to a Sturmey-Archer three-speed transmission and then a further long chain to the single rear wheel. Several of the components including front axles were bought from the Blériot-Whippet company which had closed down. Hilton-Peacey Motors also offered to supply spares to Blériot-Whippet owners.

The body was made largely of plywood covered in fabric. The chassis was made of laminated ash and the front axle was carried on quarter elliptic leaf springs. To simplify the transmission the back wheel was unsprung.

Four people were employed including Hilton Skinner and Bob Peacey and about 40 cars were made. They sold for £65.

== See also ==
- List of car manufacturers of the United Kingdom
