= 3-hexulose-6-phosphate synthase =

Class of enzymes

Identifiers
- EC no.: 4.1.2.43

Databases
- IntEnz: IntEnz view
- BRENDA: BRENDA entry
- ExPASy: NiceZyme view
- KEGG: KEGG entry
- MetaCyc: metabolic pathway
- PRIAM: profile
- PDB structures: RCSB PDB PDBe PDBsum
Search
- PMC: articles
- PubMed: articles
- NCBI: proteins

3-hexulose-6-phosphate synthase (EC 4.1.2.43, D-arabino-3-hexulose 6-phosphate formaldehyde-lyase, 3-hexulosephosphate synthase, 3-hexulose phosphate synthase, HPS) is an enzyme with systematic name D-arabino-hex-3-ulose-6-phosphate formaldehyde-lyase (D-ribulose-5-phosphate-forming). This enzyme catalyses the following chemical reaction

D-arabino-hex-3-ulose 6-phosphate $\rightleftharpoons$ D-ribulose 5-phosphate + formaldehyde

This enzyme requires Mg^{2+} or Mn^{2+} for maximal activity.
