= Rover Environmental Monitoring Station =

Weather station on Mars

Rover Environmental Monitoring Station (REMS)
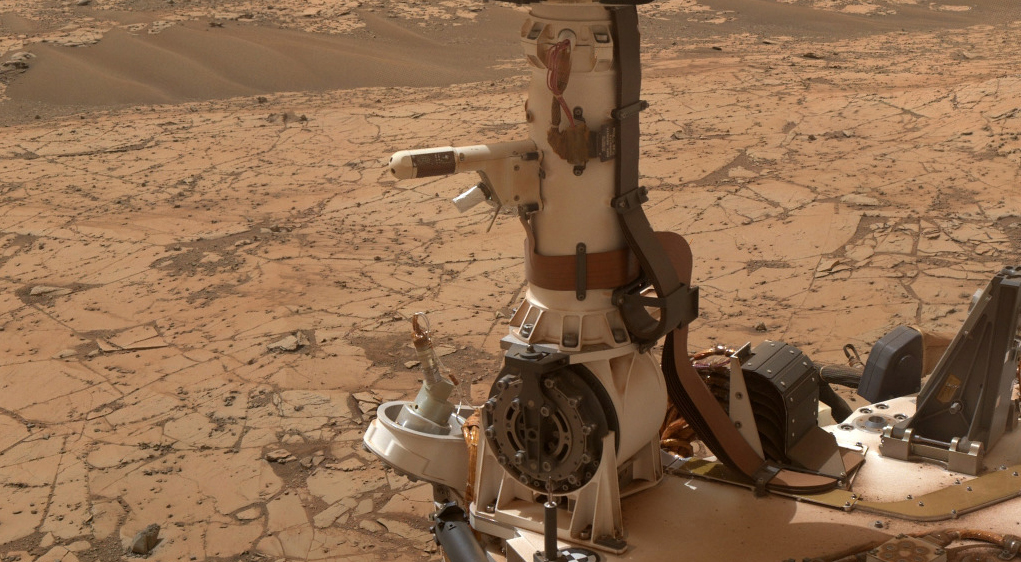
- REMS on Mars
- Operator: NASA / JPL
- Manufacturer: Spanish Astrobiology Center (CSIC-INTA)
- Instrument type: weather station

Host spacecraft
- Spacecraft: Curiosity rover
- Operator: NASA / JPL

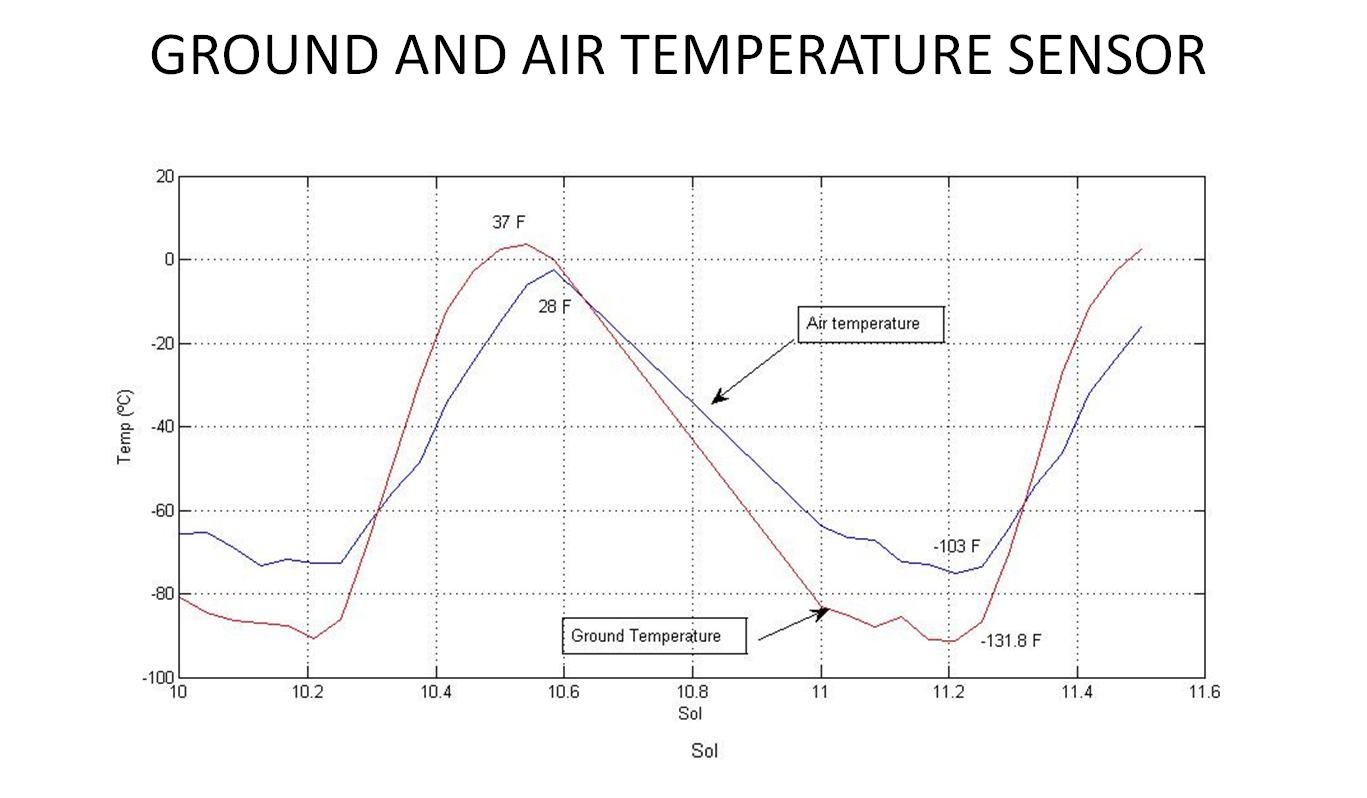
Temperatures on Mars from REMS on the Curiosity Rover (August 16/17, 2012).

Rover Environmental Monitoring Station (REMS) is a weather station on Mars for Curiosity rover contributed by Spain and Finland. REMS measures humidity, pressure, temperature, wind speeds, and ultraviolet radiation on Mars. This Spanish project is led by the Spanish Astrobiology Center and includes the Finnish Meteorological Institute as a partner, contributing pressure and humidity sensors.

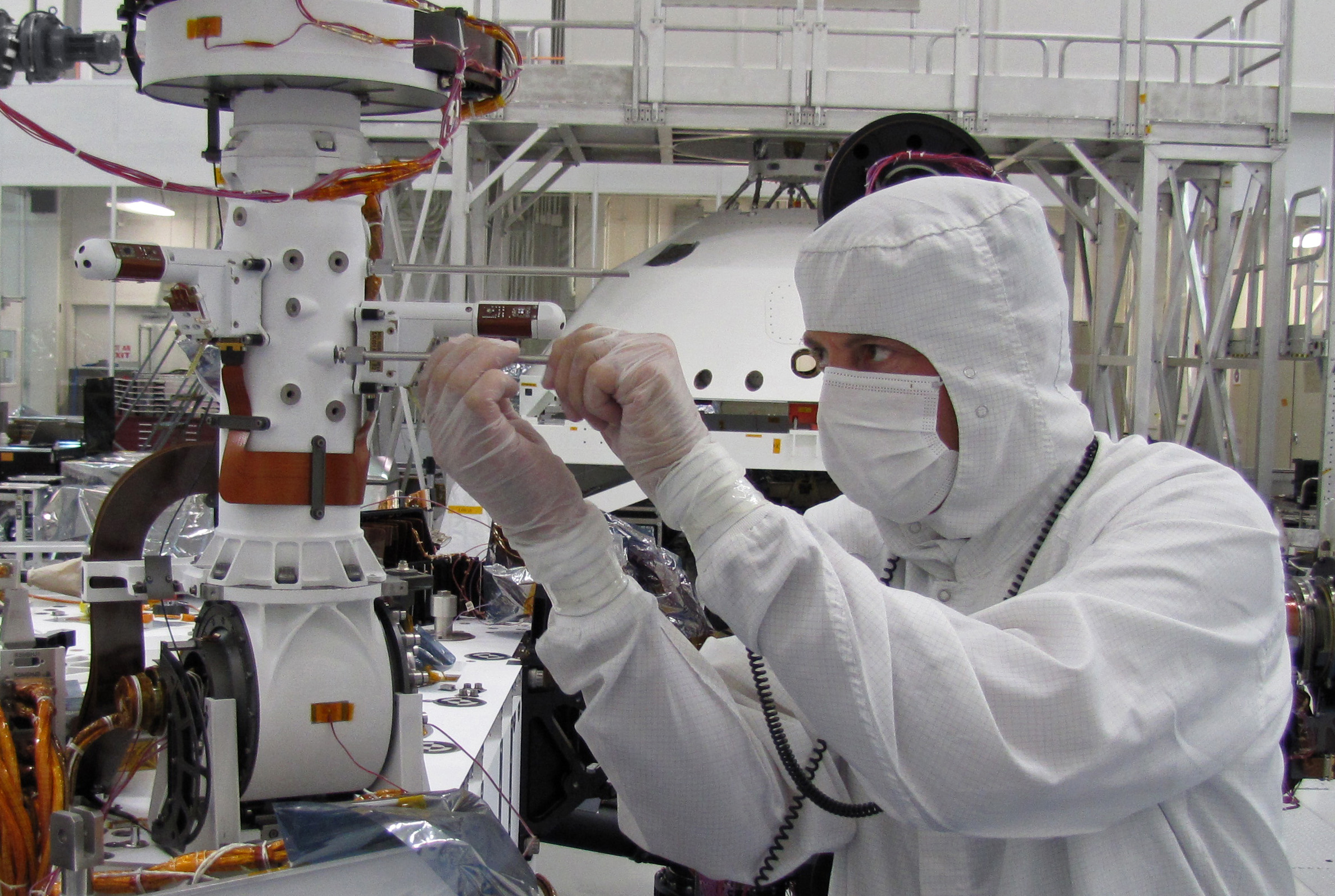
MSL Rover Environmental Monitoring Station

Closeup of a REMS sensor

== Overview ==
All sensors are located around three elements: two booms attached to the rover Remote Sensing Mast (RSM), the Ultraviolet Sensor (UVS) assembly located on the rover top deck, and the Instrument Control Unit (ICU) inside the rover. Goals include understanding Martian general circulation, microscale weather systems, local hydrological cycle, destructive potential of UV radiation, and subsurface habitability based on ground-atmosphere interaction.

By August 18, 2012, REMS was turned on and its data was being returned to Earth. The temperature at that time was 37 degrees Fahrenheit (2.8 degrees Celsius). On August 21, 2012, one of two anemometers returned data with errors. After testing it was concluded that it was broken, probably hit by a rock on descent. Martian winds can still be detected with the other sensor.

Reports are posted on the Center for Astrobiology website and Twitter daily.

Parts of REMS

- Instrument Control Unit
- Ultraviolet Sensor
- Boom 1 with:
  - Air Temperature Sensor
  - Wind Sensor
  - Ground Temperature Sensor
- Boom 2 with:
  - Air Temperature Sensor
  - Wind Sensor
  - Humidity Sensor

The pressure sensor can detect pressures from 1 to 1150 Pa (Pascal) (0.000145038 PSI to 0.1667934 PSI). For comparison, 1 atmosphere is 101,325 Pascals or 14.7 PSI.

The air temperature, wind speed and direction sensor for InSight Mars lander (planned for 2018 launch) is based on REMS, also contributed by Spain.

== Results ==
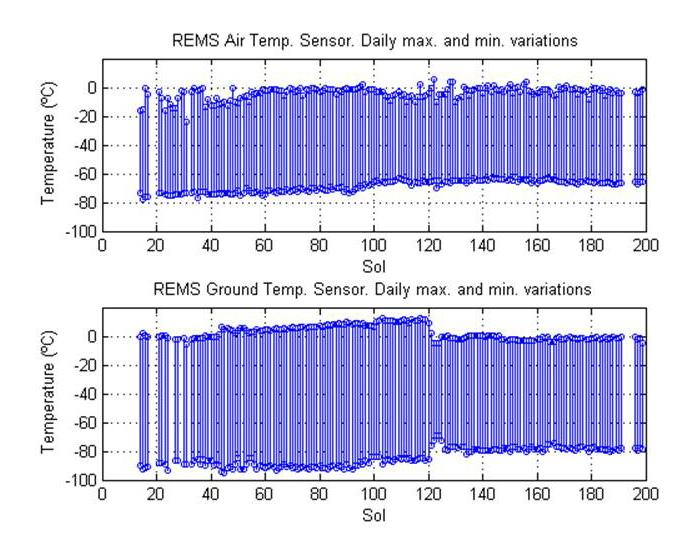
Graph of temperatures at Gale crater

== See also ==
- Ministry of Education, Culture, and Sports (Spain)
- Temperature and Winds for InSight (TWINS, for InSight lander)
