= Temperature and Winds for InSight =

Temperature and Winds for InSight (TWINS)
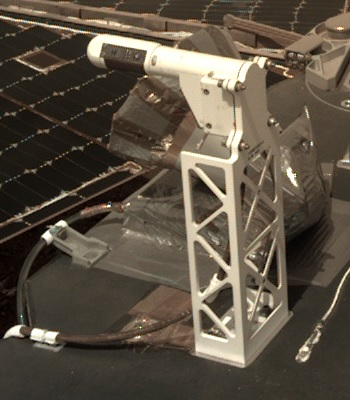
- TWINS sensor
- Operator: NASA / Jet Propulsion Laboratory
- Manufacturer: Spanish Astrobiology Center (CSIC-INTA)
- Instrument type: Atmospheric sensors
- Function: Meteorology suite
- Mission duration: 2 years (planned)
- Began operations: 26 November 2018, 19:52:59 UTC (landing)

Host spacecraft
- Spacecraft: InSight
- Operator: NASA / JPL
- Launch date: 5 May 2018, 11:05 UTC
- Rocket: Atlas V 401
- COSPAR ID: 2018-042A

Temperature and Winds for InSight (TWINS) is a NASA meteorological suite of instruments on board the InSight lander that landed on Mars on 26 November 2018. TWINS provides continuous wind and air temperature measurements to help understand the seismic data from the Seismic Experiment for Interior Structure (SEIS) instrument. The instruments were developed by the Spanish Astrobiology Center at Madrid, Spain.

== Overview ==
Sensor boom for this family of instruments

TWINS is based on the heritage from REMS (Rover Environmental Monitoring Station) on board the Curiosity rover, with enhanced performances in terms of dynamic range and resolution. TWINS provides continuous wind and air temperature measurements to help understand the seismic data from the SEIS instrument.

While probing the internal structure of Mars is the primary scientific goal of the InSight mission, atmospheric science remains a key science objective. InSight will provide a continuous and higher-frequency record of pressure, air temperature and winds at the surface of Mars than previous in situ missions.

The sensors include thermometers, and an anemometer to measure wind speed and direction twice per second. Additional sensors are the InSight FluxGate (IFG) magnetometer provided by University of California, Los Angeles (UCLA) to measure the direction and magnitude of magnetic fields such as those caused by the Martian ionosphere; and a highly sensitive pressure sensor (barometer) from Jet Propulsion Laboratory (JPL).

Wind, temperature, pressure and magnetometer data is used to understand the local wind behavior at the landing site to help understand and interpret SEIS data. At the same time, the lander uses its cameras to document cirrus clouds that develop high above Elysium Planitia, any instances of fog that appear along the ground, as well as dust devils. With this data, scientists are able to gain even greater insights into Mars' weather and climate, supplementing what was collected by previous missions, and what is currently being gathered by the Curiosity rover about 600 km to the south.

== Auxiliary Payload Sensor Suite (APSS) ==
TWINS on InSight is part of what is called the Auxiliary Payload Sensor Suite, forming a "weather station" which components include:

- TWINS: Temperature and wind sensor developed by the Spanish Astrobiology Center (CAB), Madrid, Spain
- IFG: InSight FluxGate magnetometer, developed by the University of California at Los Angeles (UCLA) ay USA
- PS: Pressure sensor developed by the TAVIS company at USA
- PAE: Electronics controlling the TWINS, PS and IFG sensors developed by JPL

== See also ==
- Atmosphere of Mars
- Climate of Mars
- Geology of Mars
- Rover Environmental Monitoring Station, on board the Curiosity rover
