= Hagal dune field =

Martian dune field

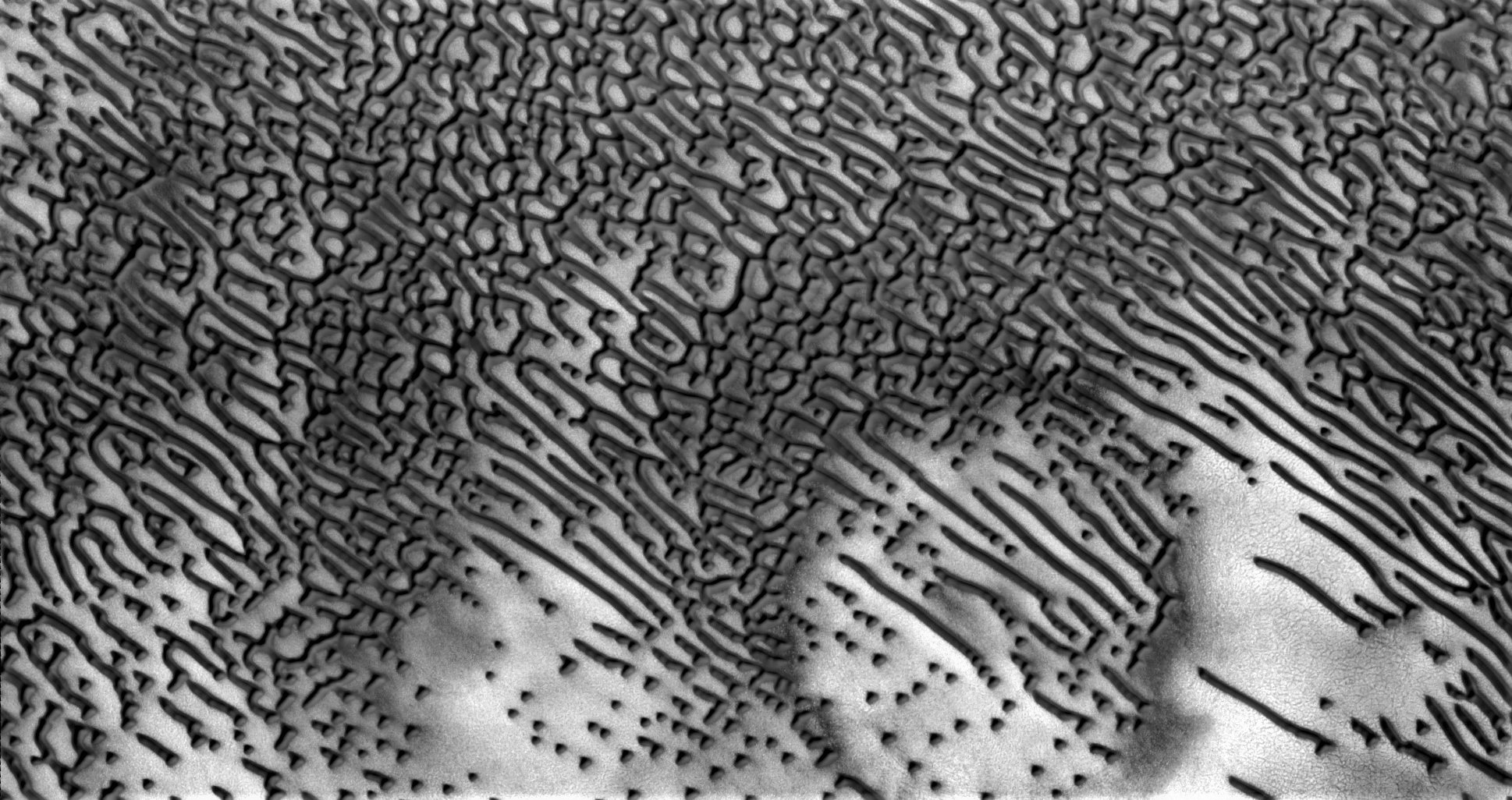
The Hagal dune field. Image was taken on 6 February 2016 at 15:16 local Mars time.

Hagal is the informal name of a dune field on Mars located below the north pole of Mars. Its name derives from the sand dunes in Frank Herbert's novel Dune and the fictional planet Hagal. It is located at coordinates 78.0° N latitude, 84.0° E longitude, and consists of linear and round dunes with a southeast slipface orientation. It was one of the dune formations targeted for imaging by the HiRISE camera, on board the Mars Reconnaissance Orbiter, at the rate of one image every six weeks. in the third year (MY31–Mars Year 31) of its seasonal expedition. It is also known as the "Martian Morse Code" due to the linear and rounded formations of its dunes, which have the appearance of dots and dashes.

== Formation ==
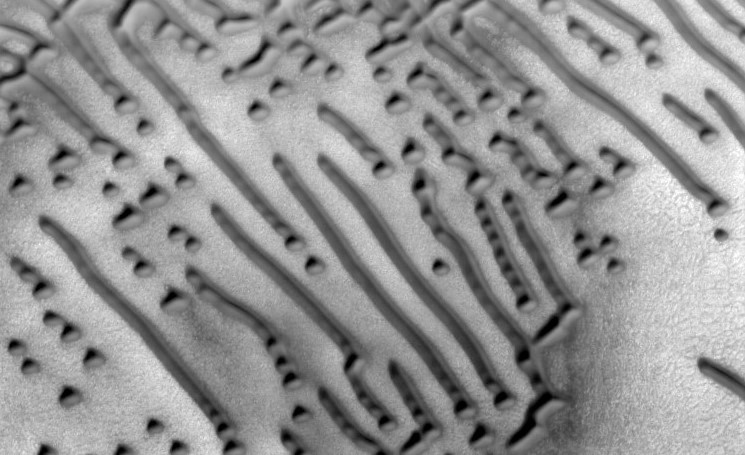
Detail of the dots and dashes of the dunes on 6 February 2016, at 15:16 local Mars time.

Although normally it is possible to obtain information about the wind direction from the orientation and form of sand dunes, the complexity of shapes of the Hagal dunes makes it difficult to determine the direction of the forming winds. In the case of the Hagal dunes, it is theorised that a local circular crater, probably formed due to meteorite impact and filled with sand, has decreased the quantity of dune-forming sand; this, in turn, impacted the local topography, causing a change in wind patterns.

NASA video clip about the Martian Morse Code

The linear dunes (dashes) were formed through the action of bidirectional winds, acting perpendicular to the line of the sand dune, causing a funneling effect directing the sand to accumulate along the linear axis of the dune. The round-shaped dunes (dots) were formed when the winds that caused the linearly-shaped accumulations were interrupted. The round dunes are classified as "barchanoid dunes". However, the exact mechanism of either formation is still unknown and this is the reason the area was chosen for imaging by the HiRISE mission.

Veronica Bray, HiRISE camera targeting specialist, commented that there are similarly shaped dunes in other locations on Mars, but the Hagal field provides better images of these shapes due to the uncommon characteristics of its topography. Bray also decoded the "Morse Code" of a formation as "NEE NED ZB 6TNN DEIBEDH SIEFI EBEEE SSIEI ESEE SEEE !!".

== Images by HiRISE ==
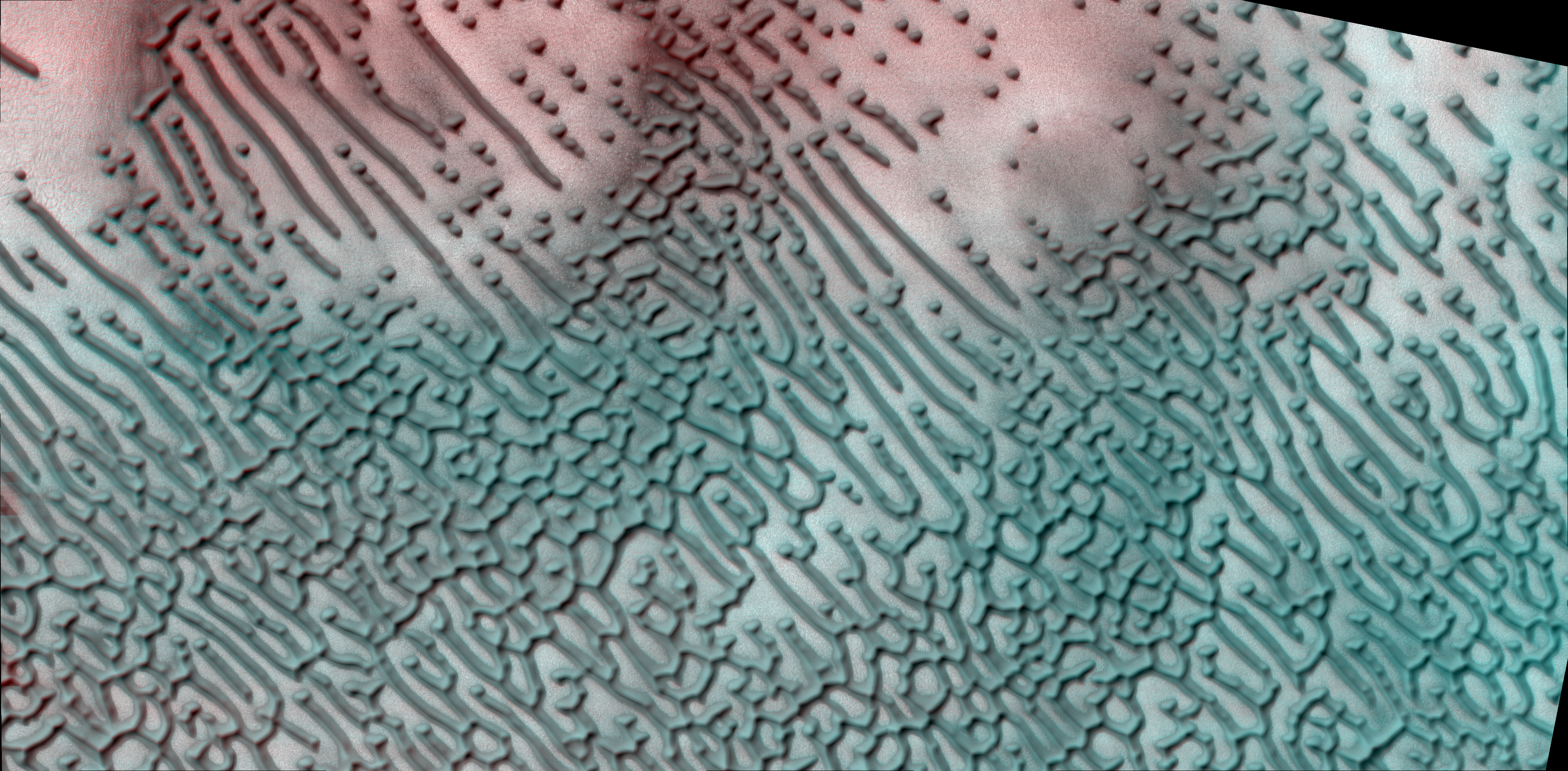
Hagal dune field anaglyph 3D

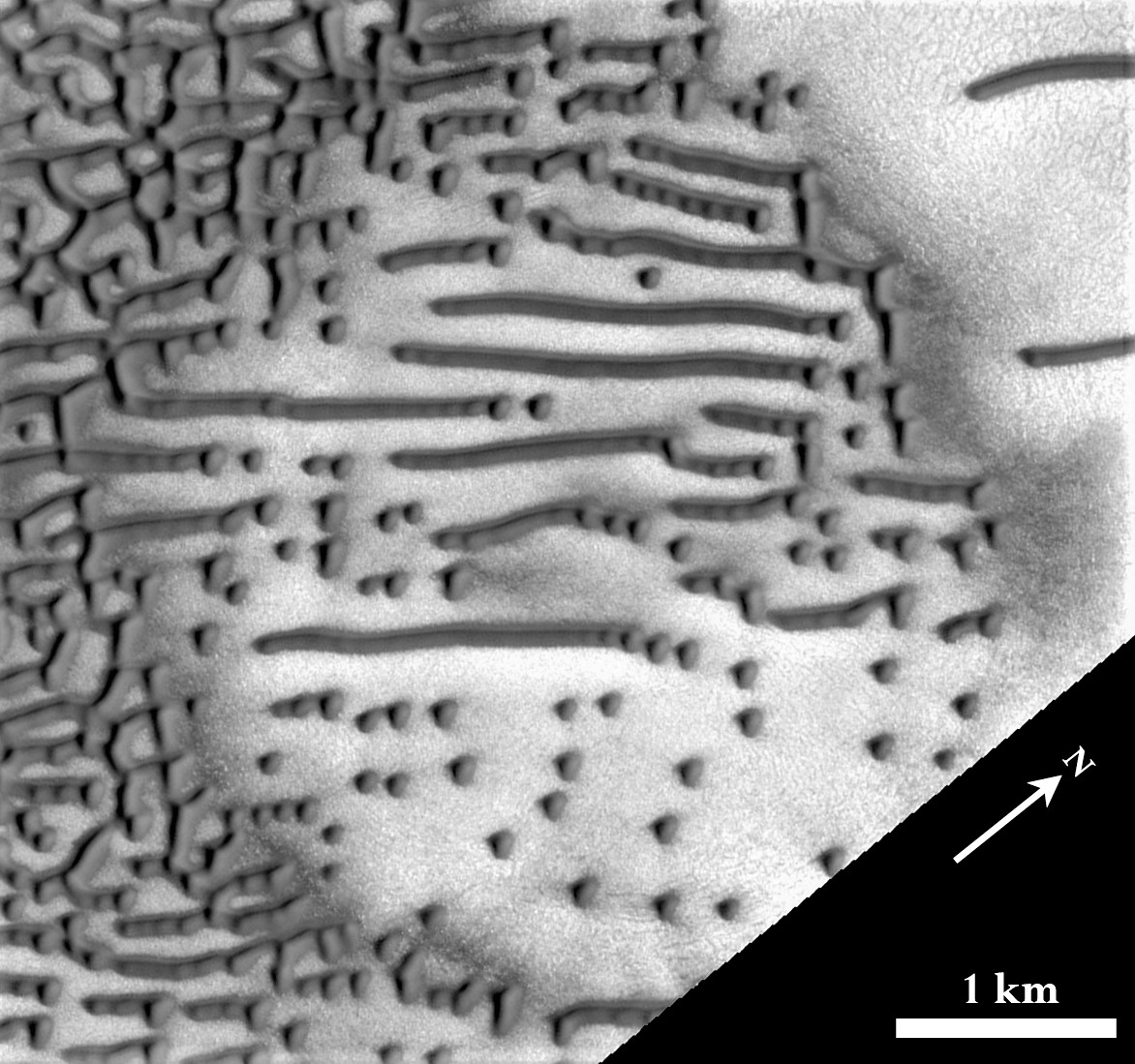
Detail of the dots and dashes of the dunes with distance scale

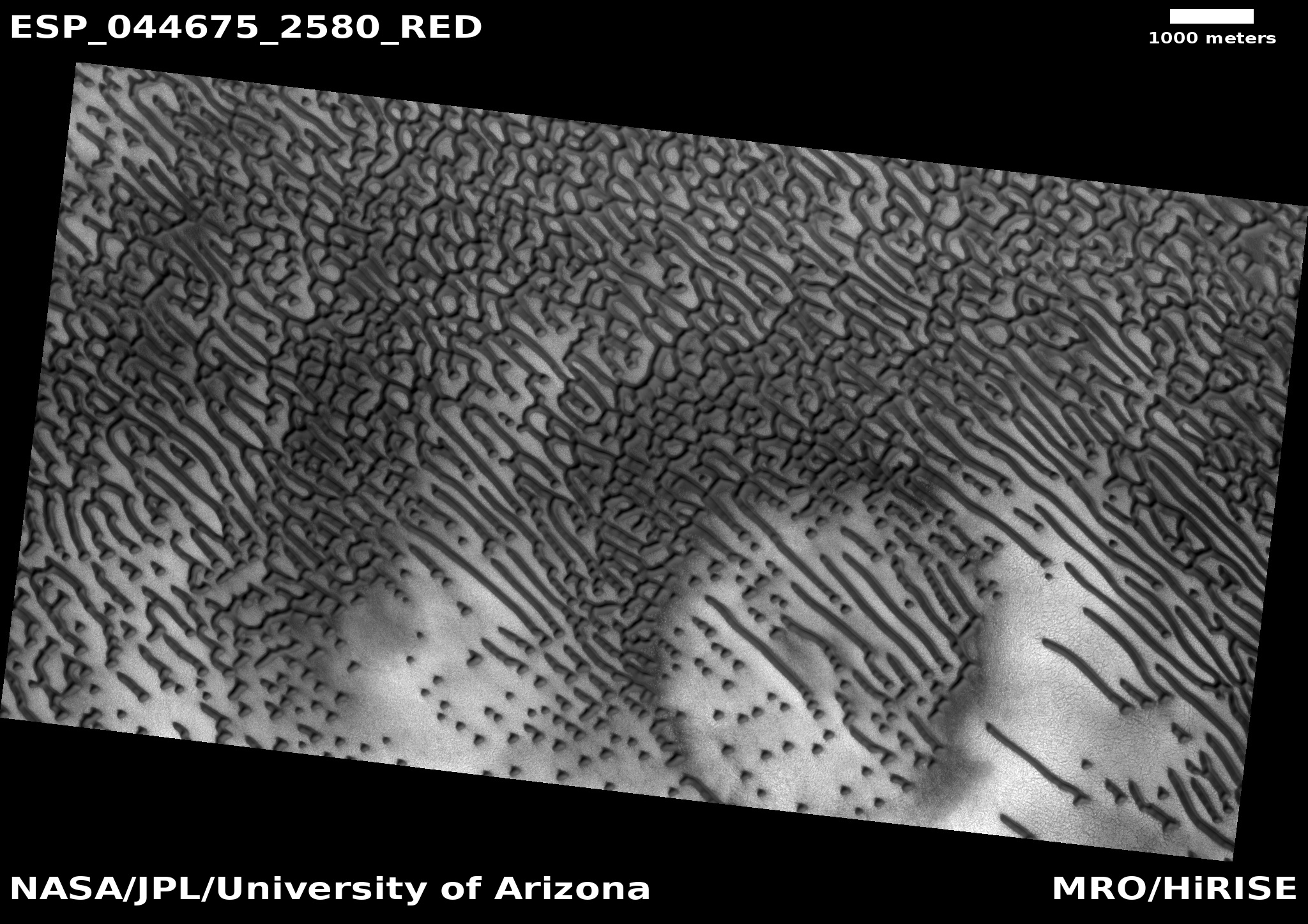
Hagal dune field black and white image, map–projected, with distance scale

== See also ==
- Classical albedo features on Mars
- Abalos Undae
- Nili Patera dune field
- Olympia Undae
- Hyperboreae Undae
- Siton Undae
- Aspledon Undae
- Ogygis Undae
