= Nili Patera dune field =

Martian dune field

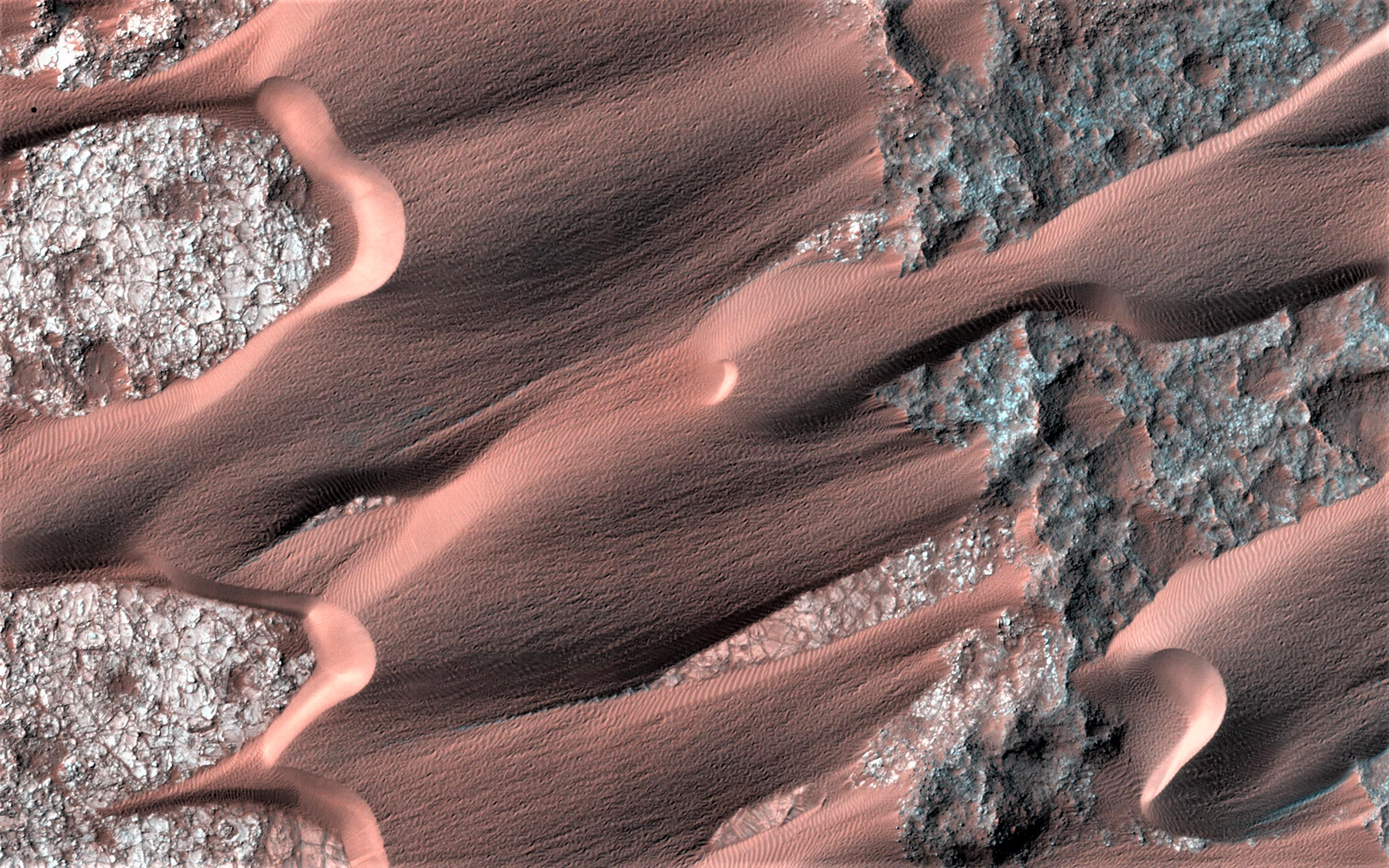
Detail of the Nili Patera dune field lying on a bed of solidified lava

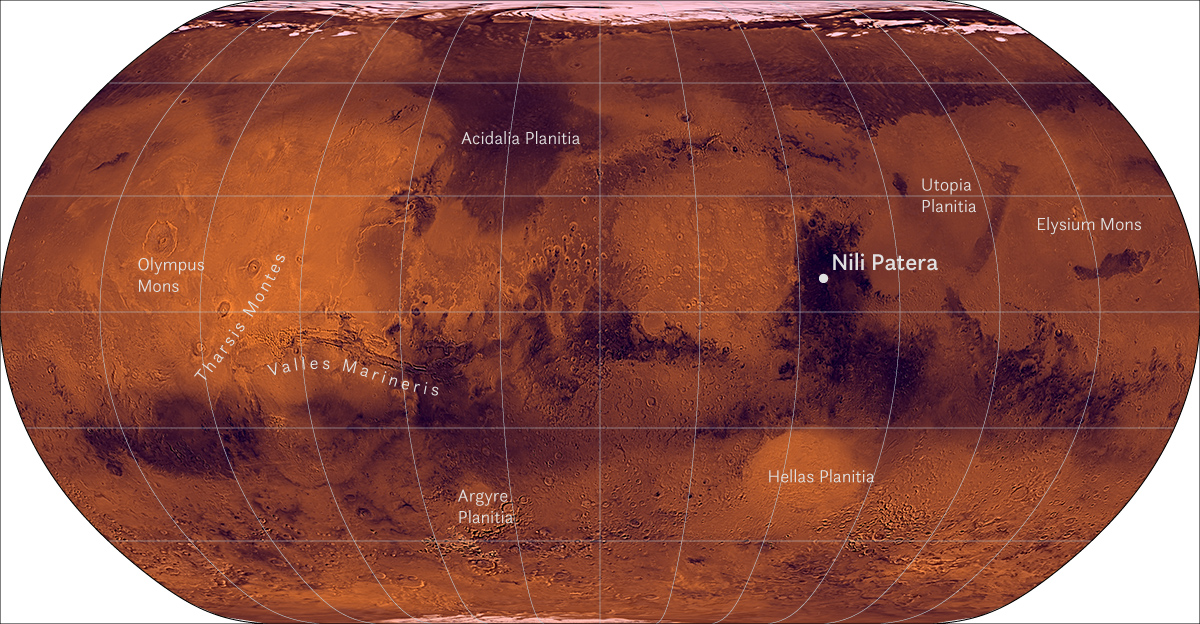
Location of Nili Patera

Nili Patera is a dune field on Mars. It is located on top of a lava bed, at the site of an ancient volcano, the Nili Patera caldera of Syrtis Major, near the Martian equator, and it is one of the most active dune fields of Mars. Its location coordinates on Mars are 8.7° N latitude, 67.3° E longitude. It is being actively studied by the HiRISE camera, on board the Mars Reconnaissance Orbiter, at the rate of one image every six weeks. The study of the movement of the dunes provides information regarding wind variation as a function of time and furthers the study of surface erosion characteristics of the Martian landscape. This information can then be used for the development and design of future Mars expeditions. The dunes of the Patera field are of the barchan type and their study by HiRISE was the first one to establish dune and ripple movement of a minimum of 1 metre (3 ft 3 in) on Mars. The Patera dune field, was also the first to be investigated using the COSI-Corr software, which was originally developed to analyse the movement of earthbound dunes. The research results from the evidence provided by the monitoring of the Nili Patera field, indicate sand fluxes of the order of several cubic metres per metre per year, similar to the flux observed at the sand dunes of Victoria Valley in Antarctica.

== Investigation ==
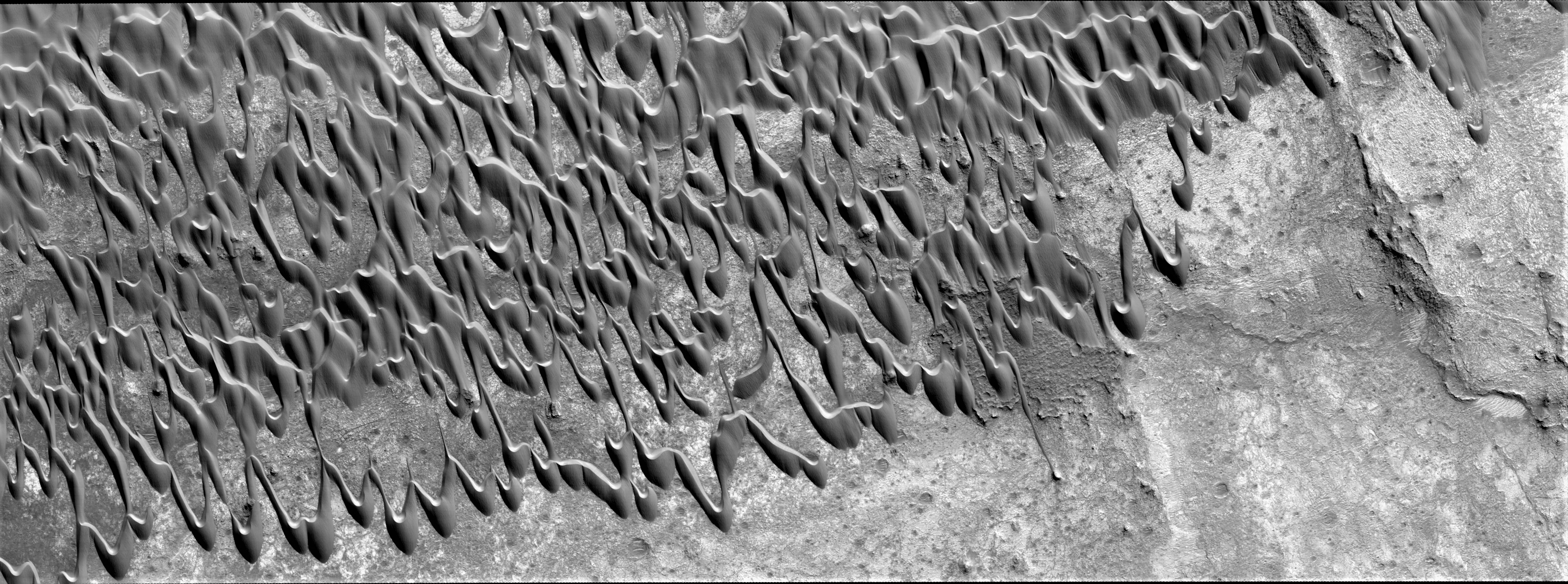
A wider angle view of the Nili Patera dune field

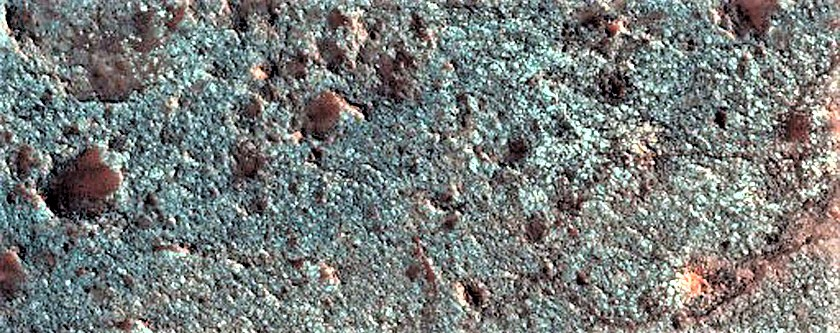
Sand dunes in the Nili Patera caldera

Over a period of 35 years, starting with Mariner 9 and ending with Mars Odyssey, there had been no detection of sand movement on Mars. Up to that point, scientists had speculated about the static or dynamic nature of Martian dunes. To answer that question, the Nili Patera dunes were examined by HiRise at different times and the results were analysed using software designed to analyse movement of the dunes by examining the differences between the photographs over time. It was discovered that the Patera dunes changed their morphology over time, and, therefore, the Nili Patera dune field has very dynamic formation characteristics. In addition it was discovered that there was a velocity difference between the top and bottom strata of the dune, with the top layer ripples moving at a higher velocity than the ripples of the bottom one. This indicates that the dune is moving as a unit across the Martian landscape.

Time-lapse photography of the Nili Patera dune field, over a three-year period (2007–2010), indicating movement of the ripples of the dunes

The flux rates of the migrations of the ripples versus the whole dune were determined, and from that calculation, the relative proportion of low-energy sand grains, primarily responsible for ripple migration, called the "reptons", versus the higher energy grains, the "saltons", was determined. The saltons are primarily responsible for the movement of the dune as a unit. Such movement mechanism is called saltation and it has been determined that the dunes at Nili Patera, under the existing wind conditions, are active and moving as a unit. Due to the thinner atmosphere of Mars, winds have to be approximately 10 times faster than those on Earth to cause sand movement. These high winds occur very rarely on Mars, but because of the thinner atmosphere and lower gravity of the planet, sand grains, once in motion, can move faster and to a longer distance than on Earth.

It is theorised, that on Mars, once high winds initiate the movement of the sand particles, weaker winds can sustain the motion of the dune, due to the lower gravity of the planet and the lower resistance of the thinner atmosphere. The lighter-coloured surface under the dunes of the Nili Patera Dune Field is ancient lava which has cooled. The cracks in the lava surface are filled with dark sand, of probable volcanic origin. However, it is not known if the volcanic sand originates from the local caldera, or has blown from another volcanic site.

The sand flow rate, known as flux, of the Nili Patera dunes is approximately equal to the flux of the dunes in Victoria Valley, Antarctica. The Nili Patera dune movement can be used to predict rock erosion rates due to sand blasting the rocks. Based on the gathered evidence, rock erosion rates are predicted to be close to the ones in Antarctica. In a paper published in the journal Nature, NASA scientists report that they have detected motion of Nili Patera dunes up to a height of 200 feet (61 m) as "coherent units across the Martian landscape". These discoveries have led to increased understanding of the role the wind plays in erosion phenomena of the Martian landscape. This, in turn, can lead to better planning of future Mars expeditions, both human and robotic.

== Images by HiRISE ==
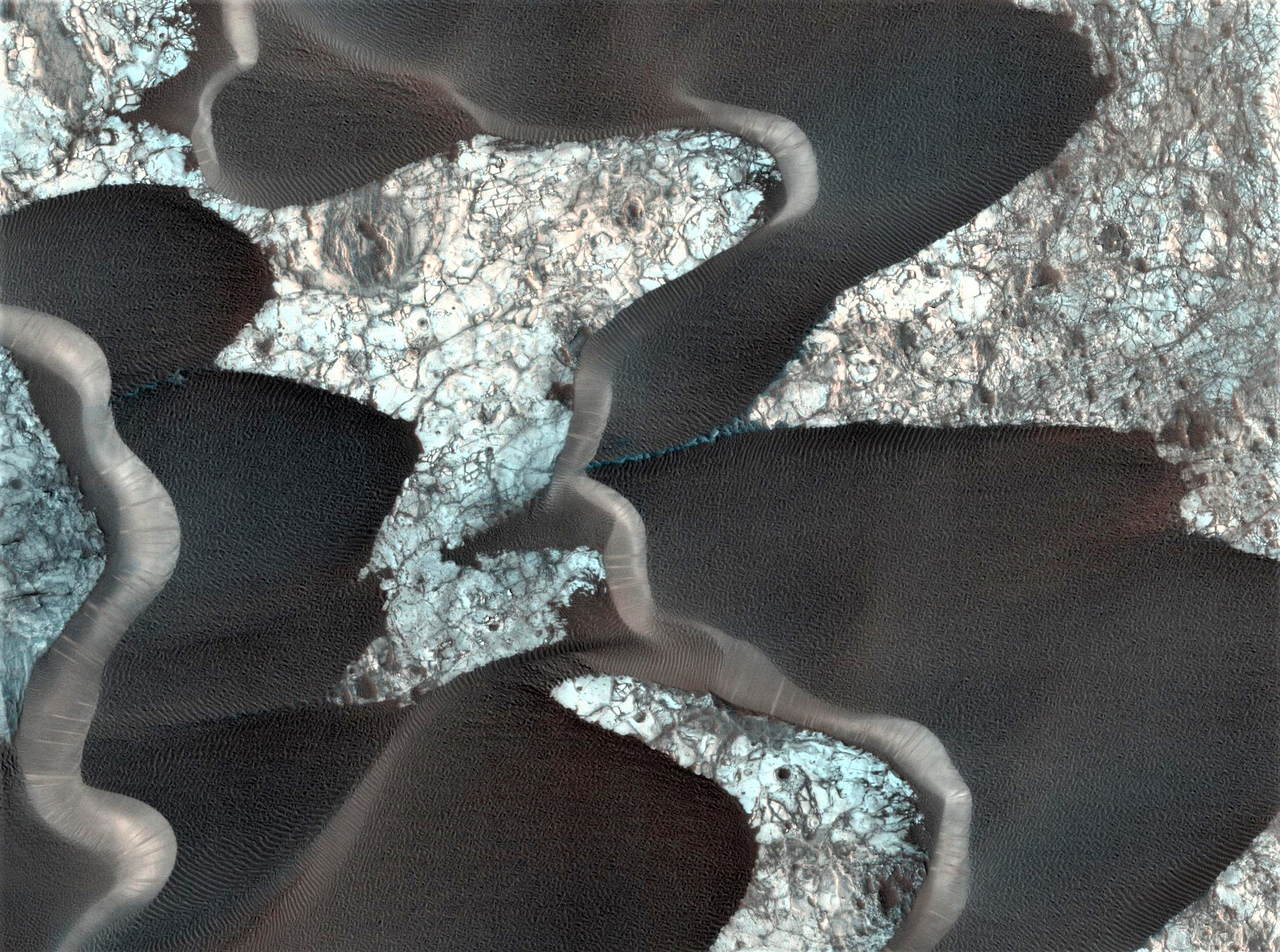
Dark sand dunes on Nili Patera of probable volcanic origin. The lighter-coloured surface is ancient lava, which has cooled. The cracks on the lava floor are filled with dark, volcanic sand.

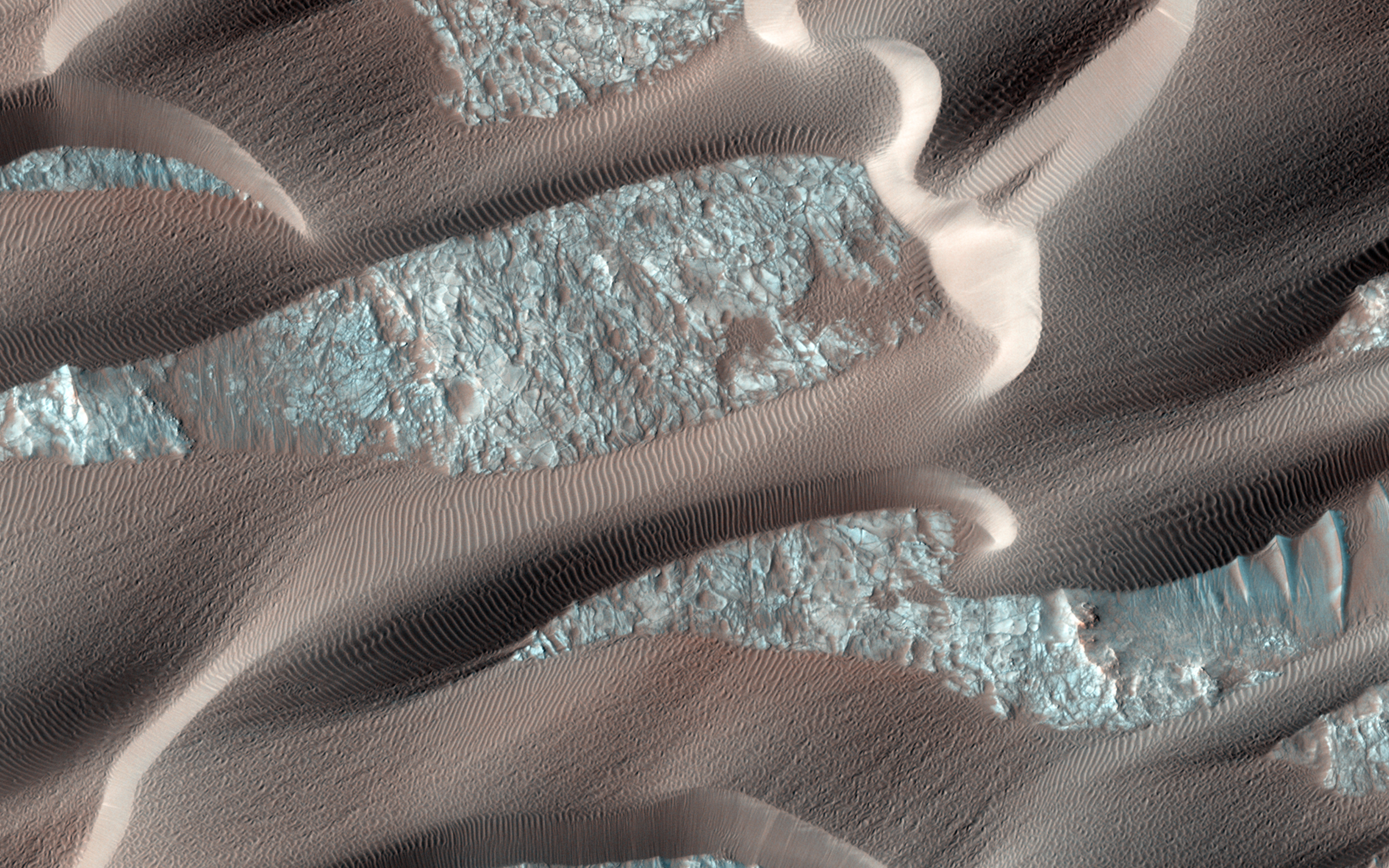
Dunes in Nili Patera, showing wind-created ripples and an avalanche on the lee side of the centre dune

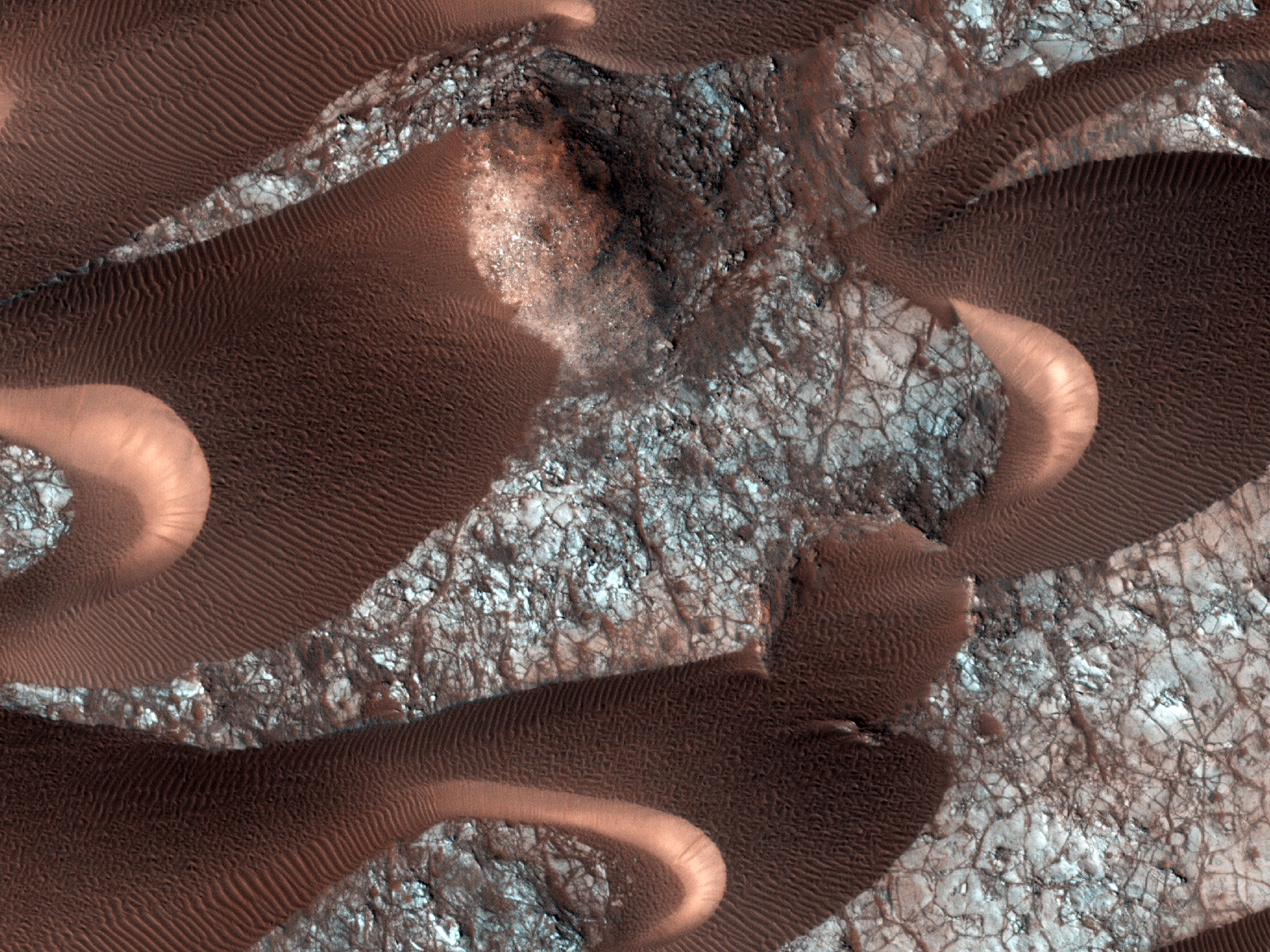
Barchan dunes at Nili Patera

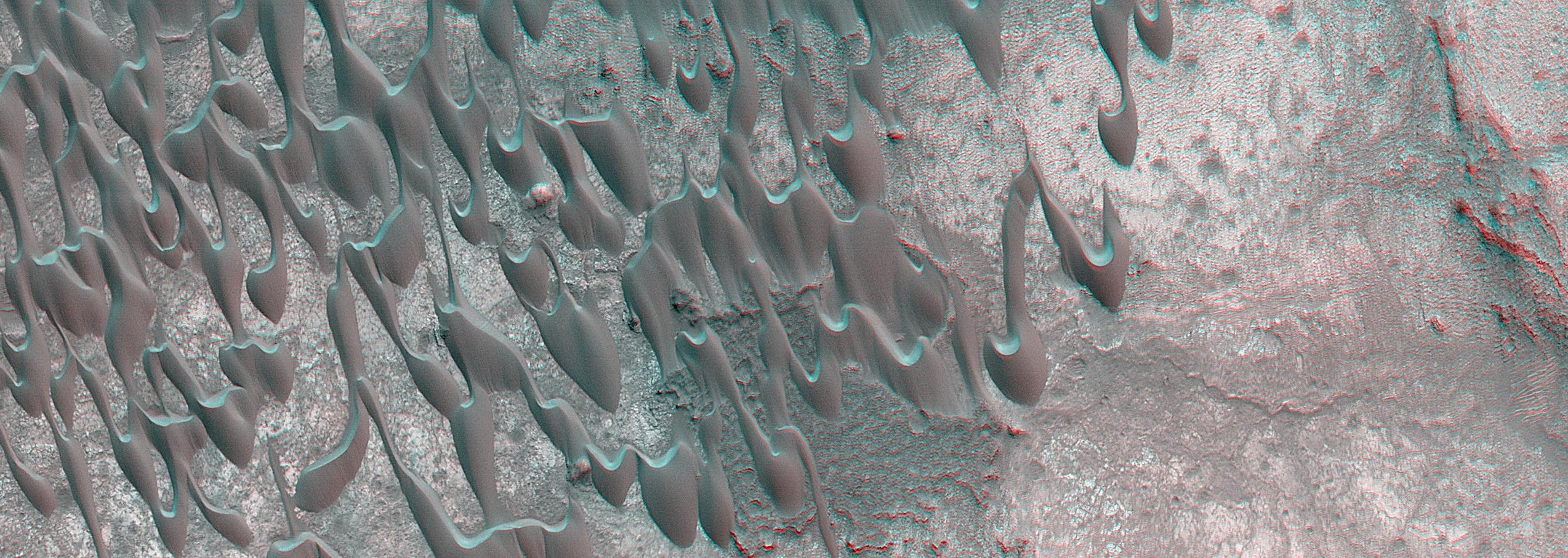
Nili Patera dune field anaglyph 3D

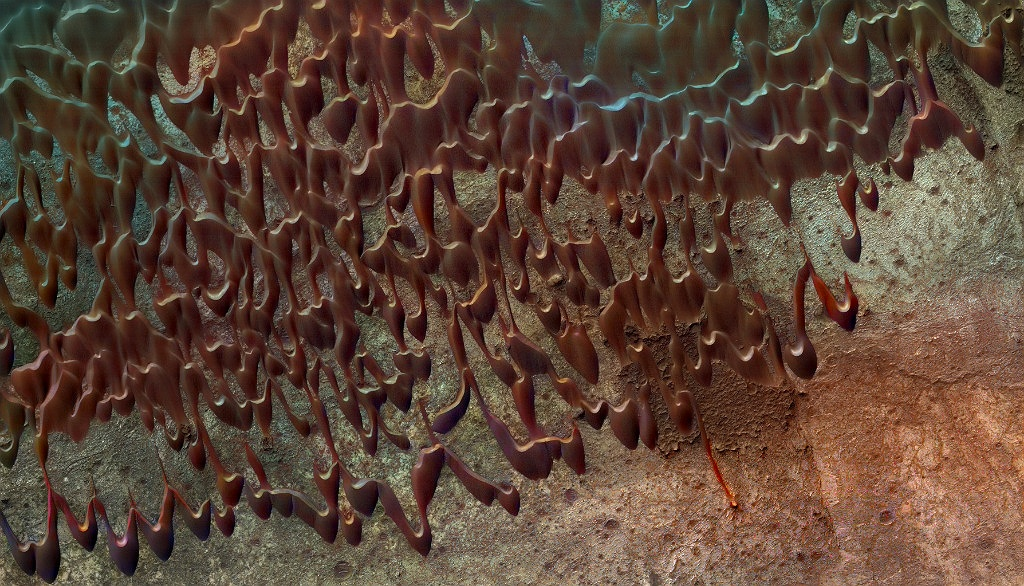

== See also ==
- Classical albedo features on Mars
- Abalos Undae
- Hagal dune field
- Olympia Undae
- Hyperboreae Undae
- Siton Undae
- Aspledon Undae
- Ogygis Undae
