= Abalos Undae =

Martian dune field

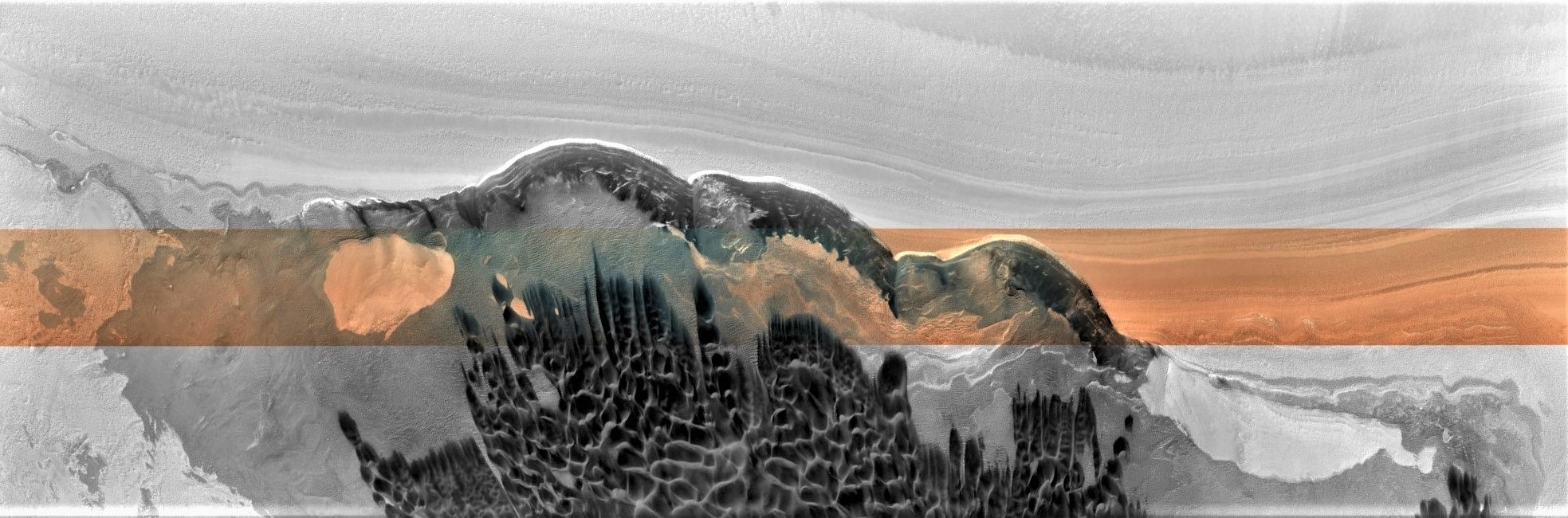
Abalos Undae dunes at Abalos Scopuli, the scarp of Abalos Mensa. The ice layers on the cap and basal formations are also visible. The picture was taken by the HiRISE camera on board the Mars Reconnaissance Orbiter and was enhanced by NASA in RGB colour.

Abalos Undae (Latin for "Abalos Waves") is a dune field on Mars in the periphery of Planum Boreum, the Martian North pole. It is one of the officially named northern circumpolar dune fields, along with Olympia, Hyperboreae, and Siton Undae, and also one of the densest of the region. Its northernmost boundary is located in the southwest channel that separates the Abalos Colles formation from the main polar ice cap, and from there the dune field extends southwest all the way to the lowlands of Vastitas Borealis.

It is theorised that the dunes of the Abalos field may have resulted from erosion of Rupes Tenuis (Latin: Thin Cliff), the polar scarp. Its name was approved by the International Astronomical Union in 1988. It extends from latitude 74.94°N to 82.2°N and from longitude 261.4°E to 283.03°E (76.97°W – 98.6°W). Its origin is located at classical albedo feature with coordinates 72°N, 70°W and has a diameter of 442.74 km.

== Location and formation characteristics ==
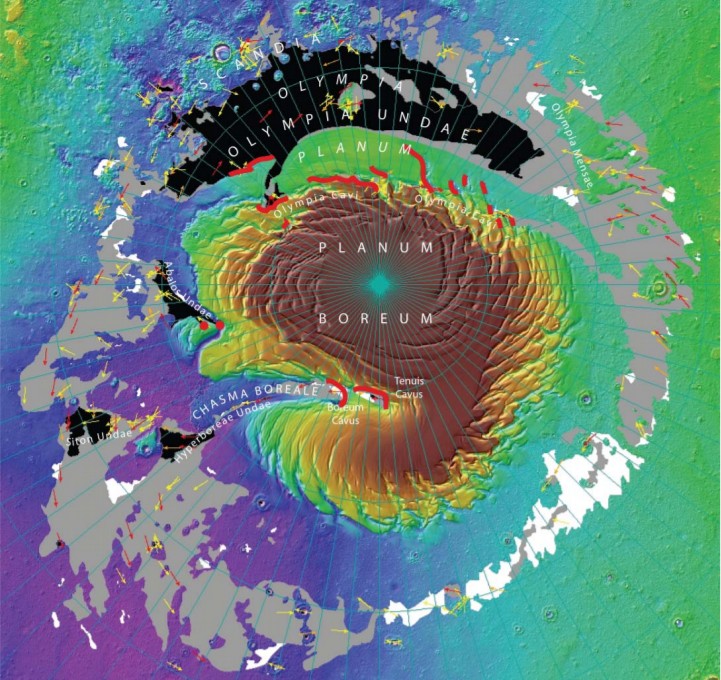
Stereographic projection map showing the density distribution of dune fields in the Planum Boreum region. The grey regions are lower density fields. The four densest dune fields including Abalos Undae are shown in black. The prime meridian is at the bottom of the map. Abalos Undae is the smaller black region at centre left, between longitude 261.4°E to 283.03°E (76.97°W – 98.6°W).

Abalos Undae is a dune field on Mars, in the periphery of Planum Boreum, the Martian north pole. It is a part of the northern circumpolar dune fields, along with Olympia, Hyperboreae, and Siton Undae, which are officially named after nearby classical albedo features. It is located in the southwest channel that separates the Abalos Colles formation remnant from the main ice cap, and continues all the way to the channel's southern boundary. The dunes of the Abalos field may have formed from erosion of Rupes Tenuis, the polar scarp. Abalos Undae has its northernmost boundary in the neighbourhood of Abalos Mensa and continues in a south-eastward direction after it emerges from the western end of a narrow channel separating Rupes Tenuis from Abalos Mensa.

Enhanced colour images obtained by the High Resolution Imaging Science Experiment (HiRISE) camera on board the Mars Reconnaissance Orbiter highlight the areas of the dunes where different materials are present. The blue areas indicate the presence of dunes of basaltic origin, while the light-colour areas are probably dust. The pictures are of sufficient resolution to show ripples on the dune surface. The ripples are generated by winds, as are the dunes. The dunes are considered stationary as a unit, with only small ripple movements present.

Similarly to the rest of the dune fields around the periphery of Planum Borealis, the Abalos dune field is considered to consist of lag deposits resulting from the ablation of the sediment found in basal units. The Abalos dune field is considered one of the densest dune fields in the northern circumpolar region of Mars. Other fields of similar density in the region include the Olympia, Hyperboreae, and Siton Undae.

The Abalos dune field consists of transverse dune linear sequences that, overall, form platforms of sand ranging from approximately 10 metres to 200 metres thickness. Abalos Undae, along with Hyperboreae and Siton Undae, is a sand tributary to mostly medium-density sand fields located east of Olympia Undae and extending to the prime meridian of Mars. Image analysis, performed using the method of spectral derivatives, indicates that Abalos Undae, and the rest of the densest dunes fields in the periphery of Planum Borealis, Olympia Undae and Hyperboreae Undae, show the highest pixel density indicating the presence of gypsum. The gypsum of Abalos Undae may be eroding due to scouring action by substrates of bedrock involved in plains formation.

== Images by HiRISE and THEMIS ==
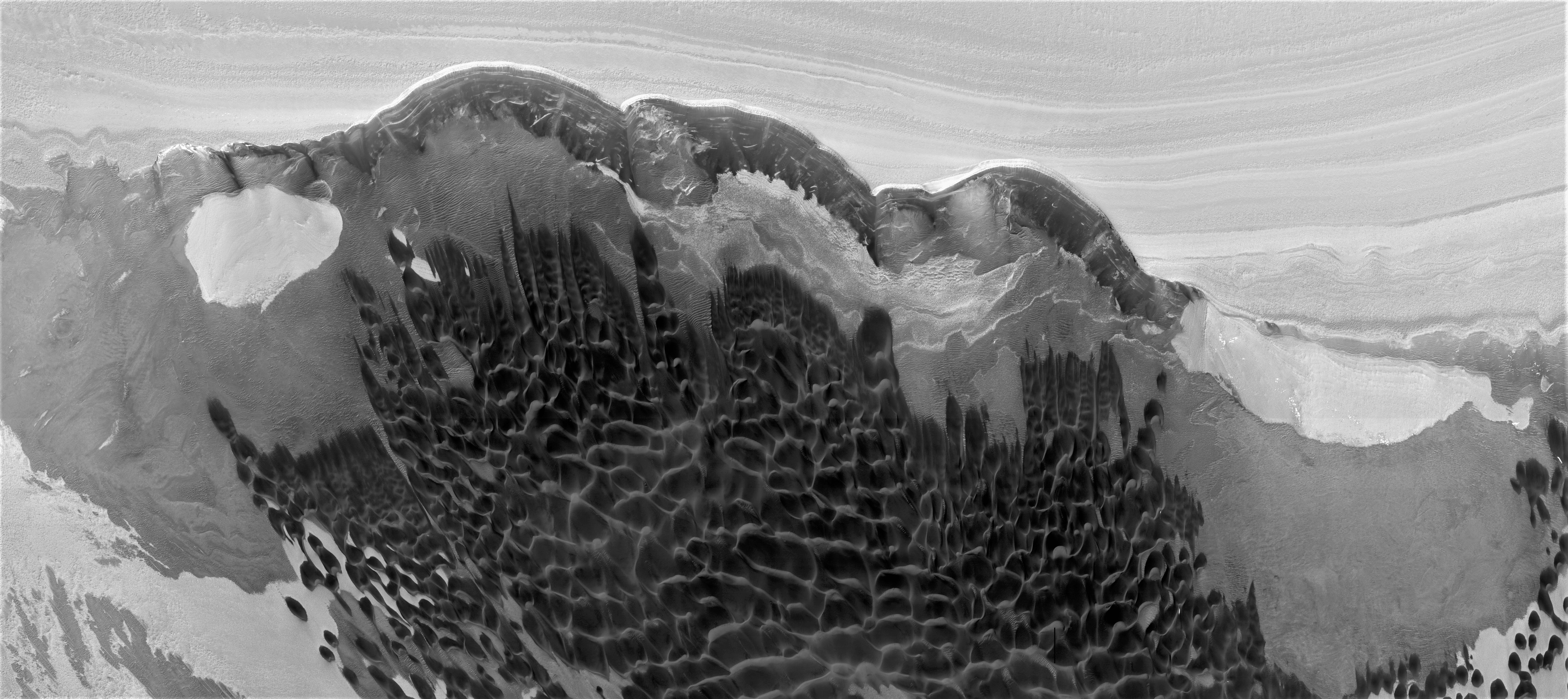
Abalos Undae at Abalos Scopuli, the scarp of Abalos Mensa

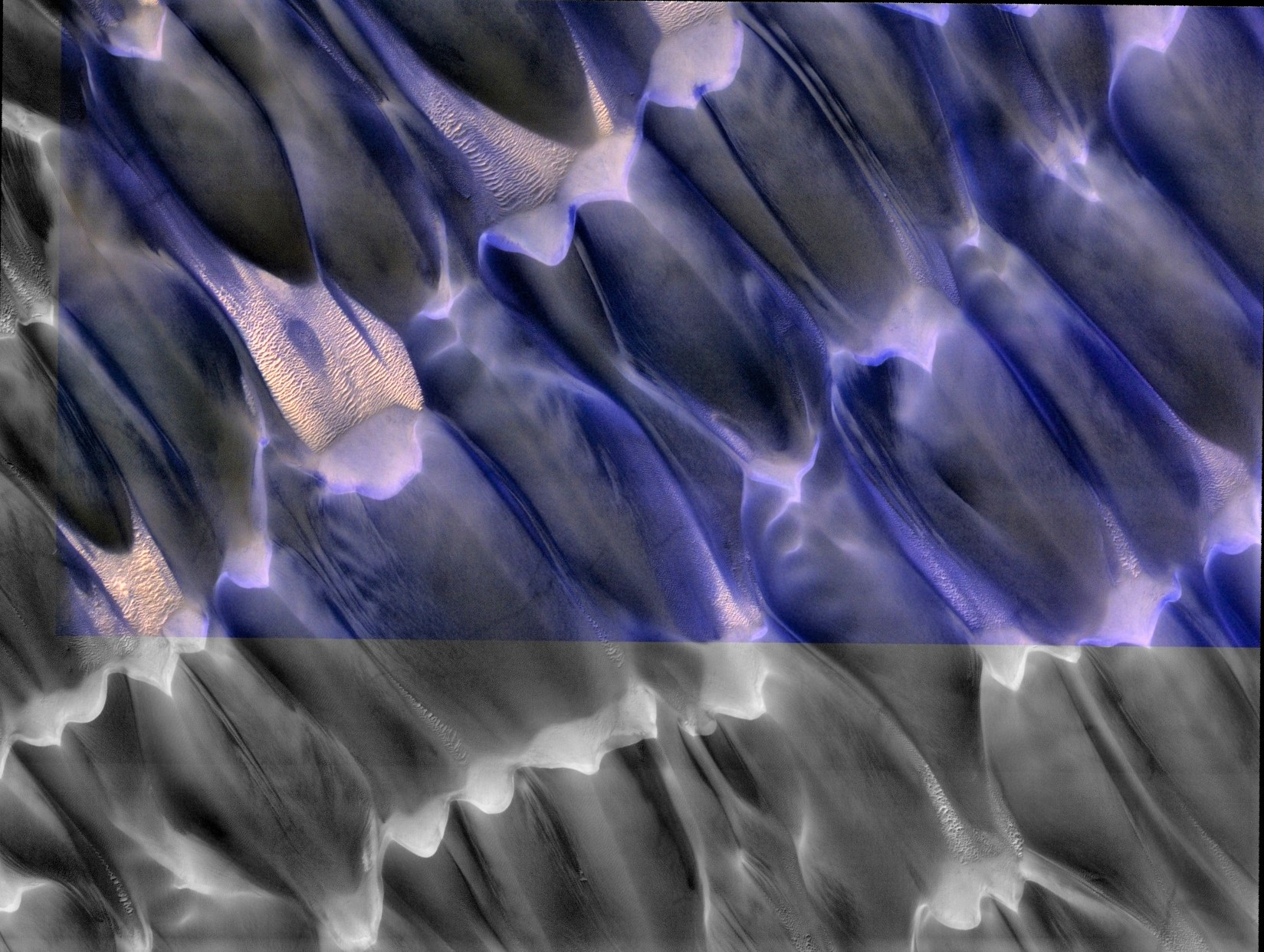
Gypsum deposits in the dunes of Abalos Undae map-projected in IRB colour

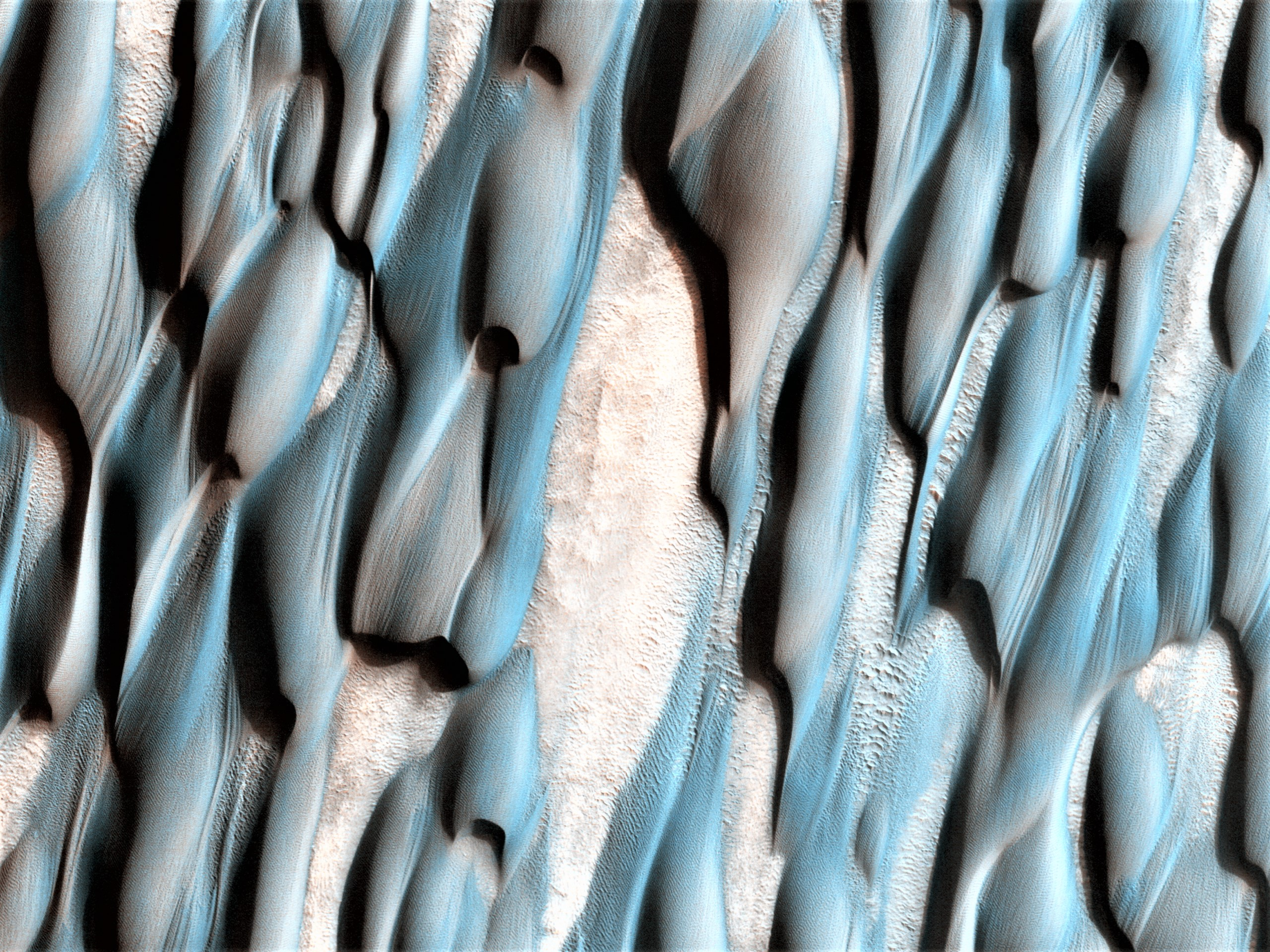
Dunes in Abalos Undae. The blue areas indicate the presence of dunes of basaltic origin, while the light-colour areas are probably dust.

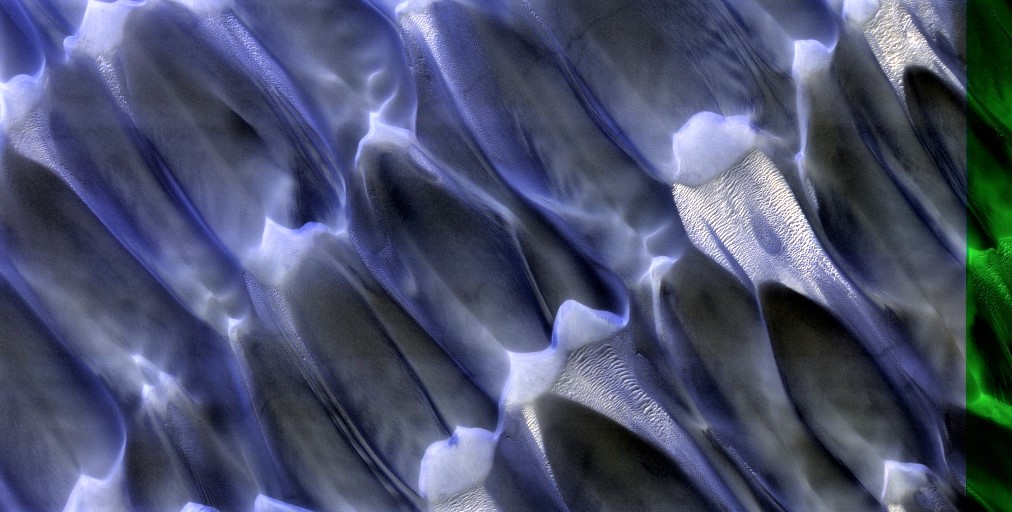
Gypsum deposits in the dunes of Abalos Undae

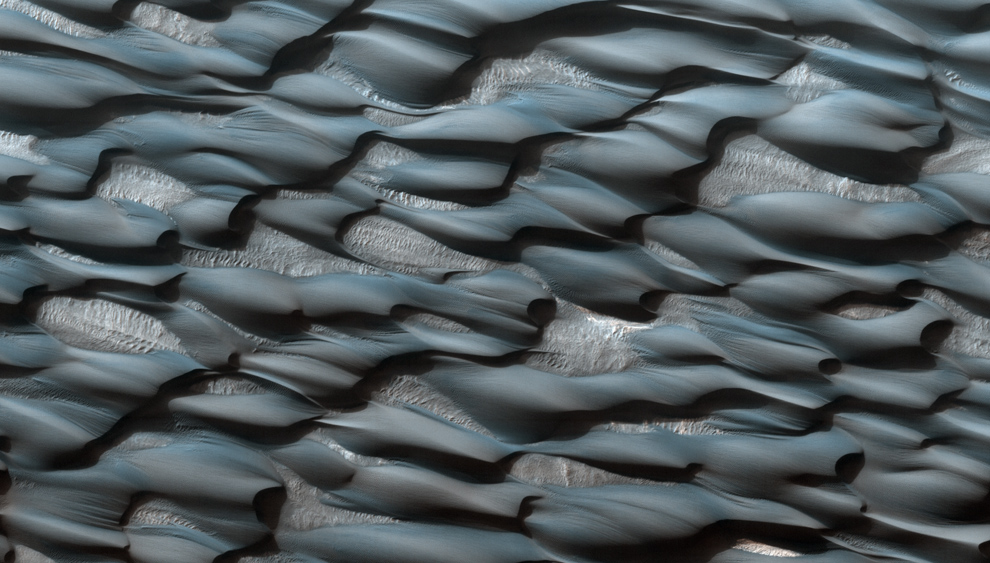
Dunes in Abalos Undae

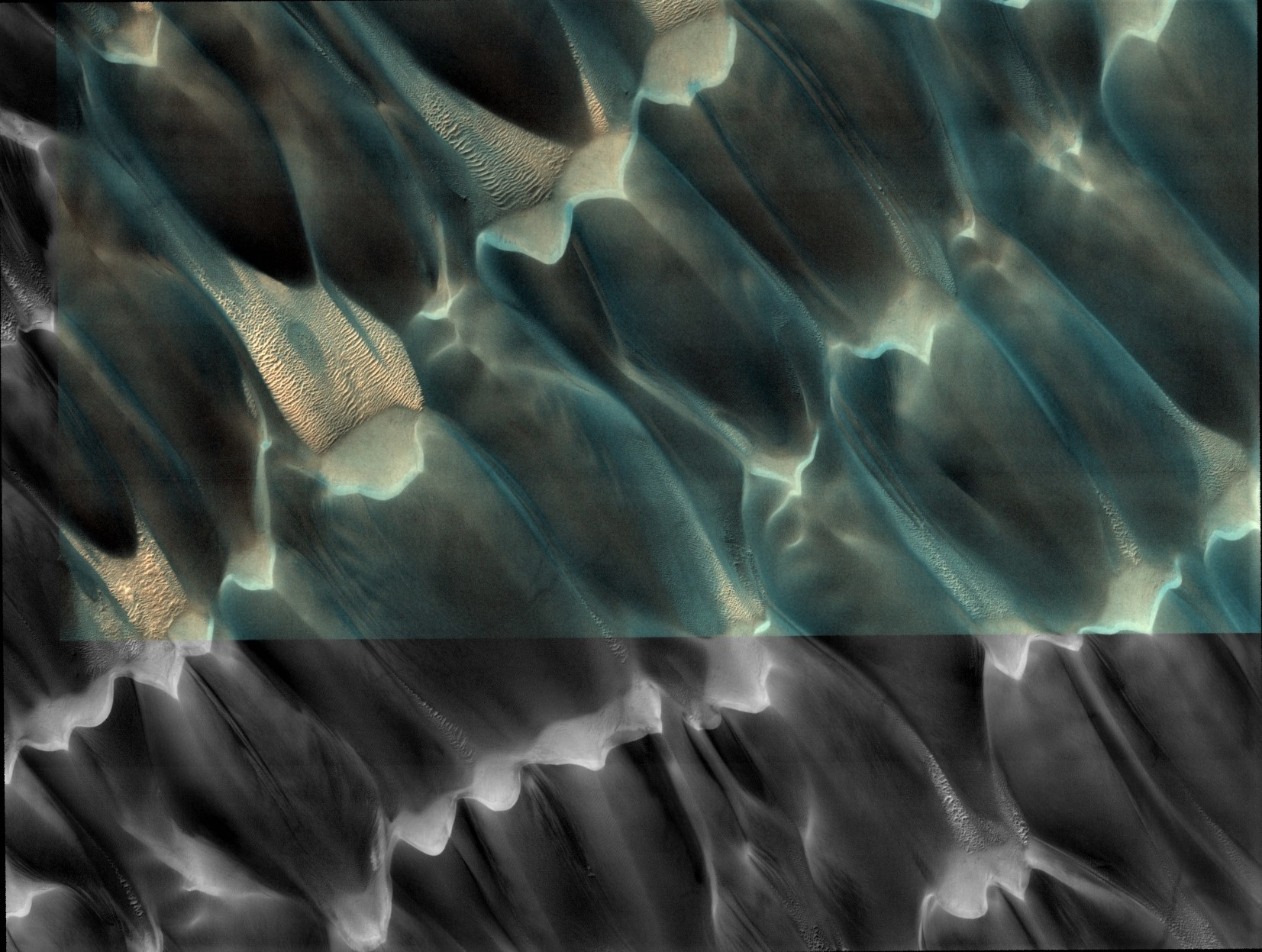
The dunes of Abalos Undae with gypsum deposits map-projected in RGB colour

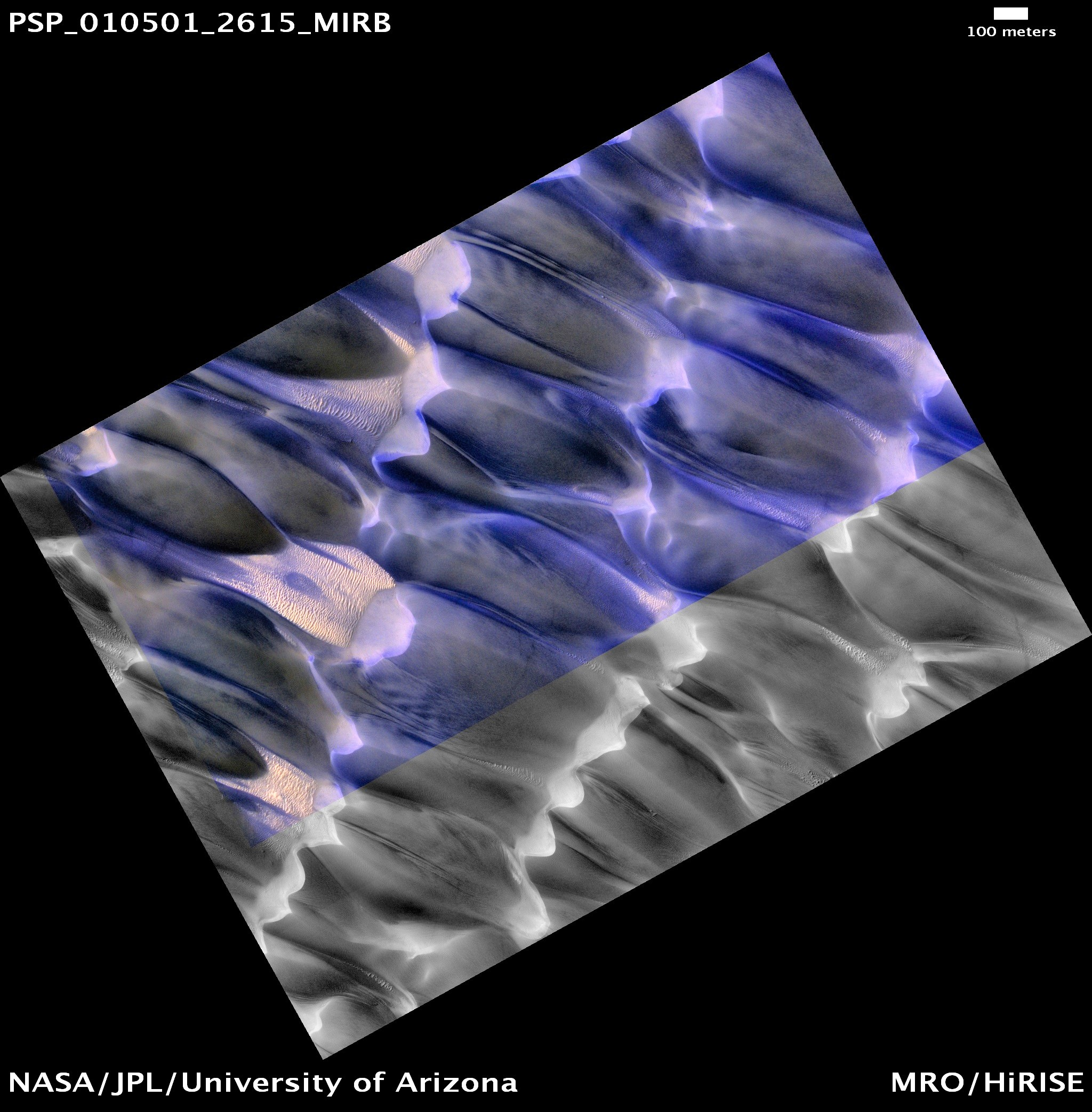
The dunes of Abalos Undae with gypsum deposits map-projected in IRB colour with scale

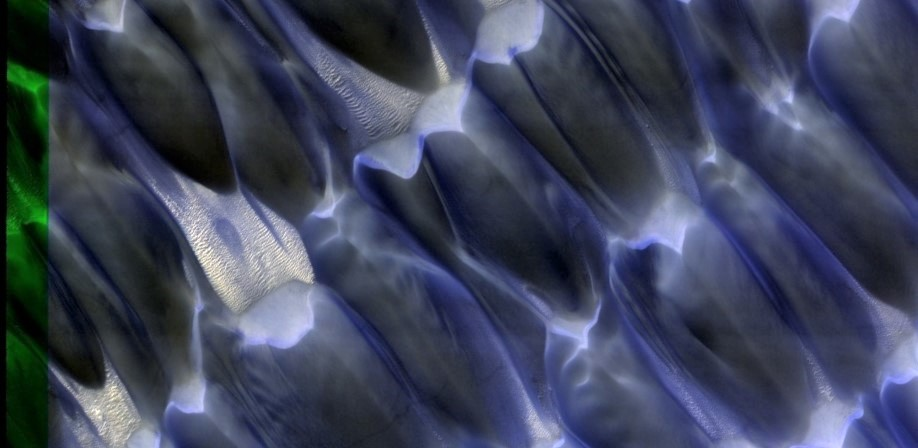
The dunes of Abalos Undae with gypsum deposits map-projected in IRB colour

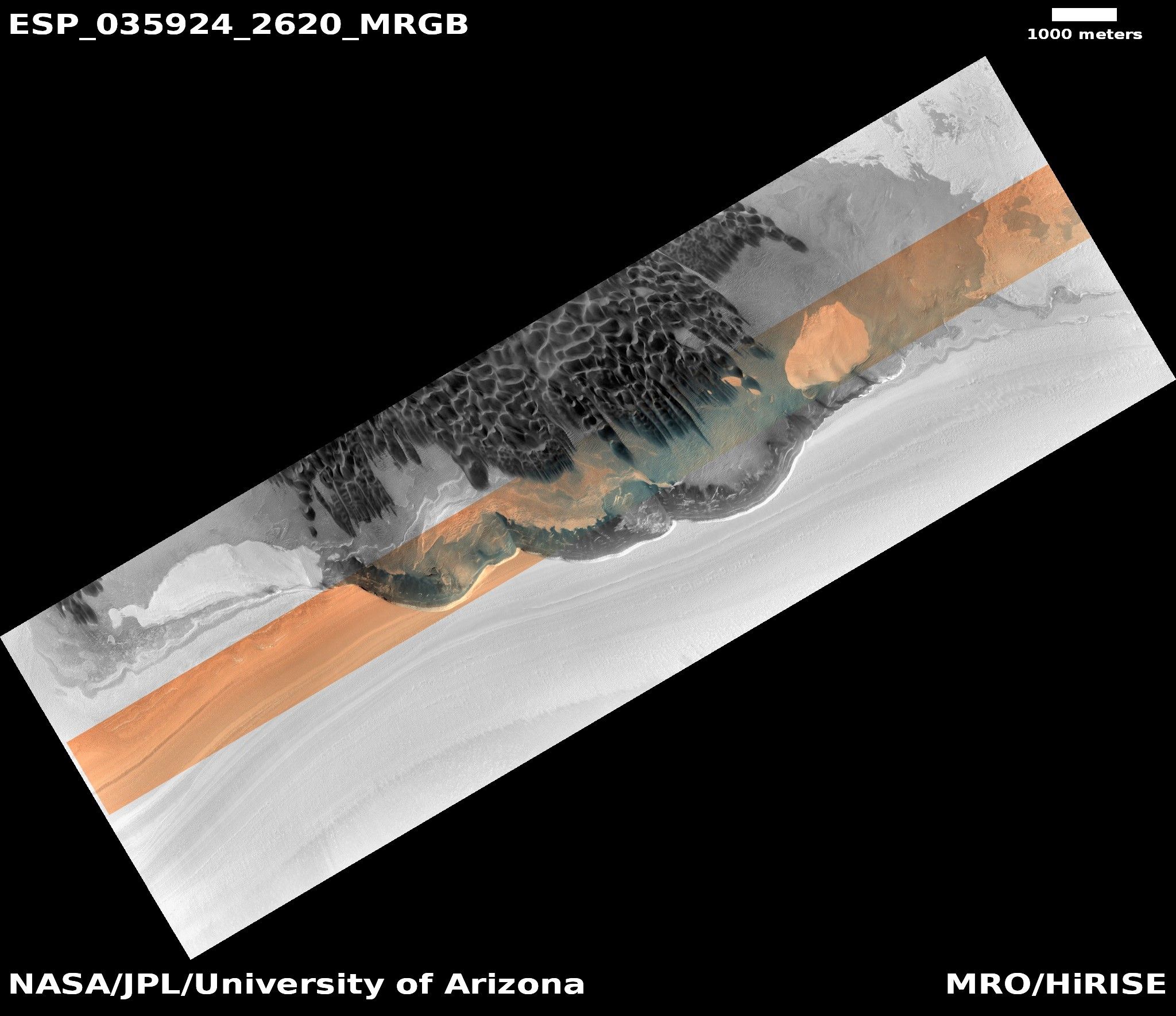
North Polar Scarp in Abalos Undae with Basal Exposure and Dunes map-projected in RGB colour and distance scale

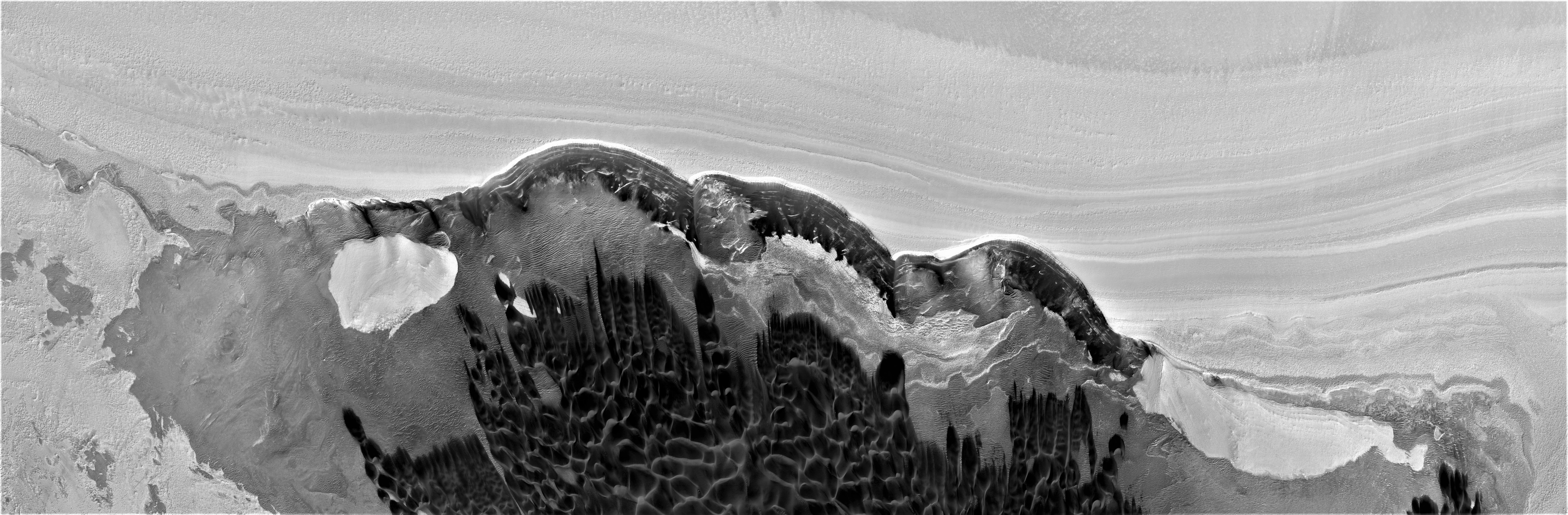
North Polar Scarp in Abalos Undae with Basal Exposure and Dunes in black and white

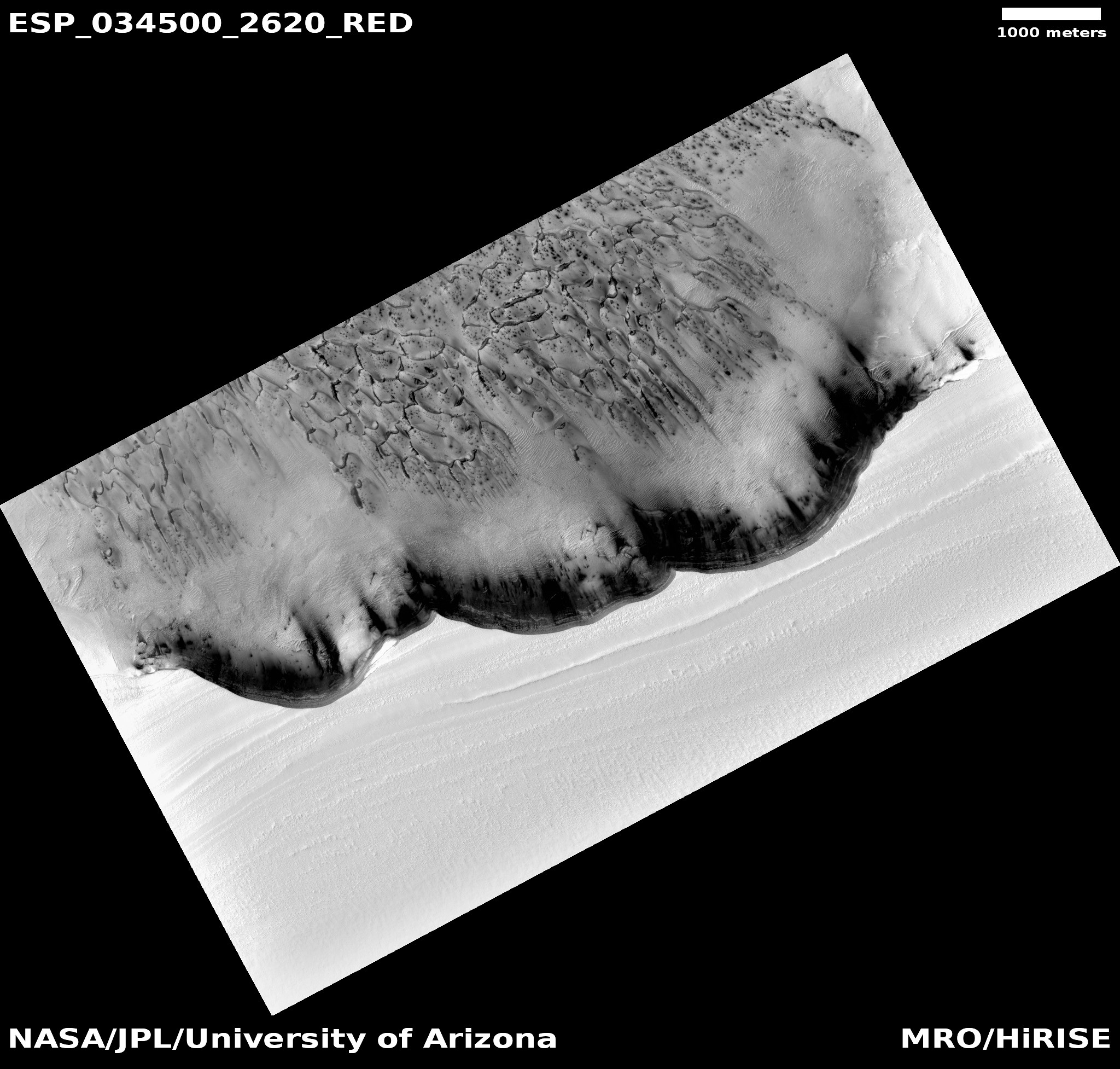
North Polar Scarp in Abalos Undae with Basal Exposure and Dunes in black and white with scale

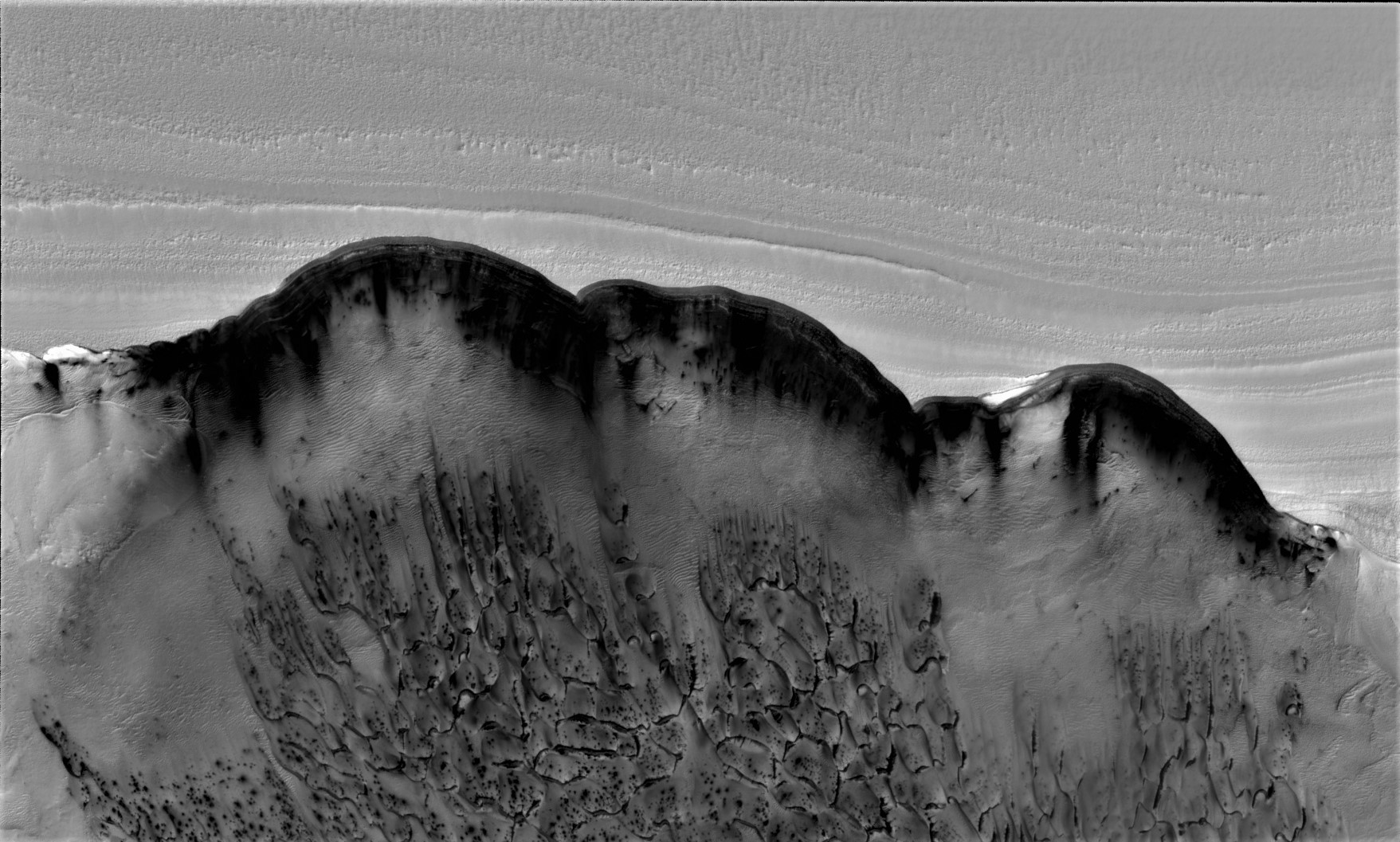
North Polar Scarp in Abalos Undae with Basal Exposure and Dunes in black and white

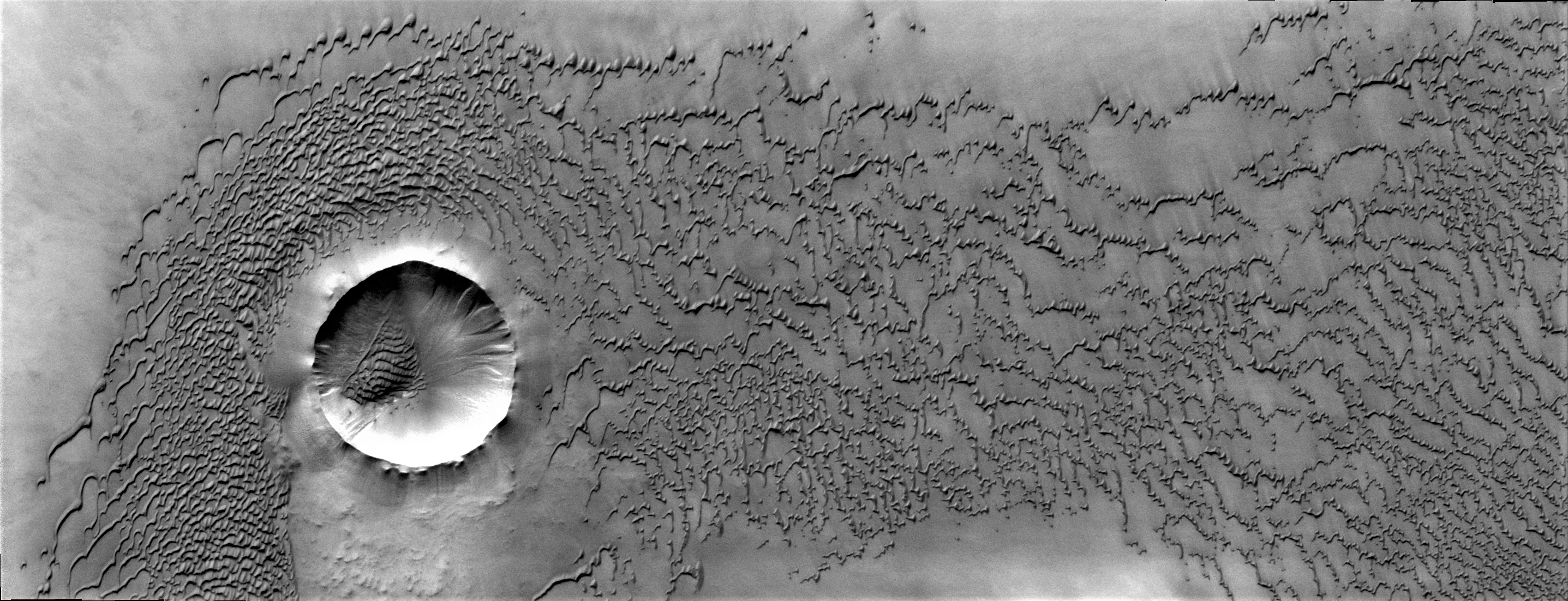
Abalos Undae dunes and crater

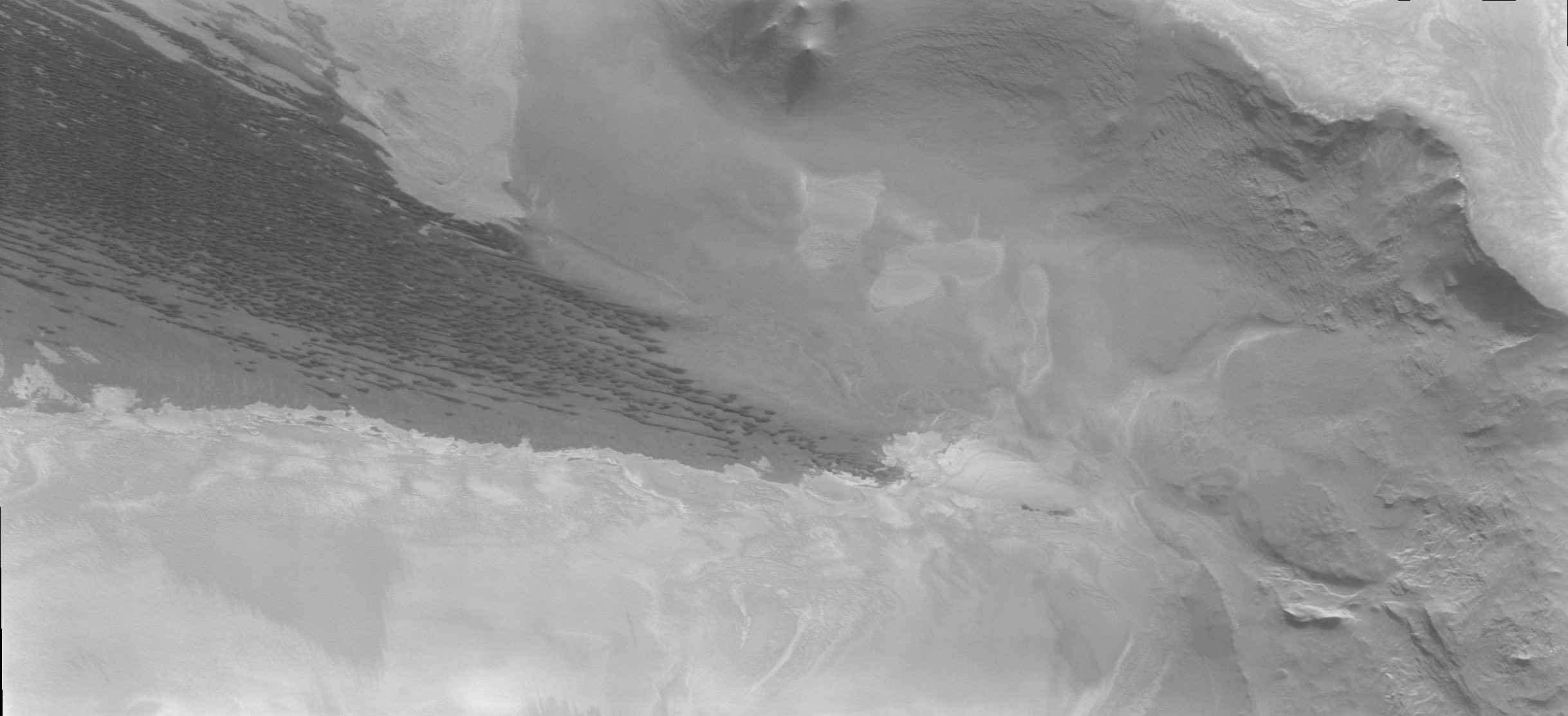
The edge of the dark dunes of Abalos Undae shown just below the polar scarp and cap

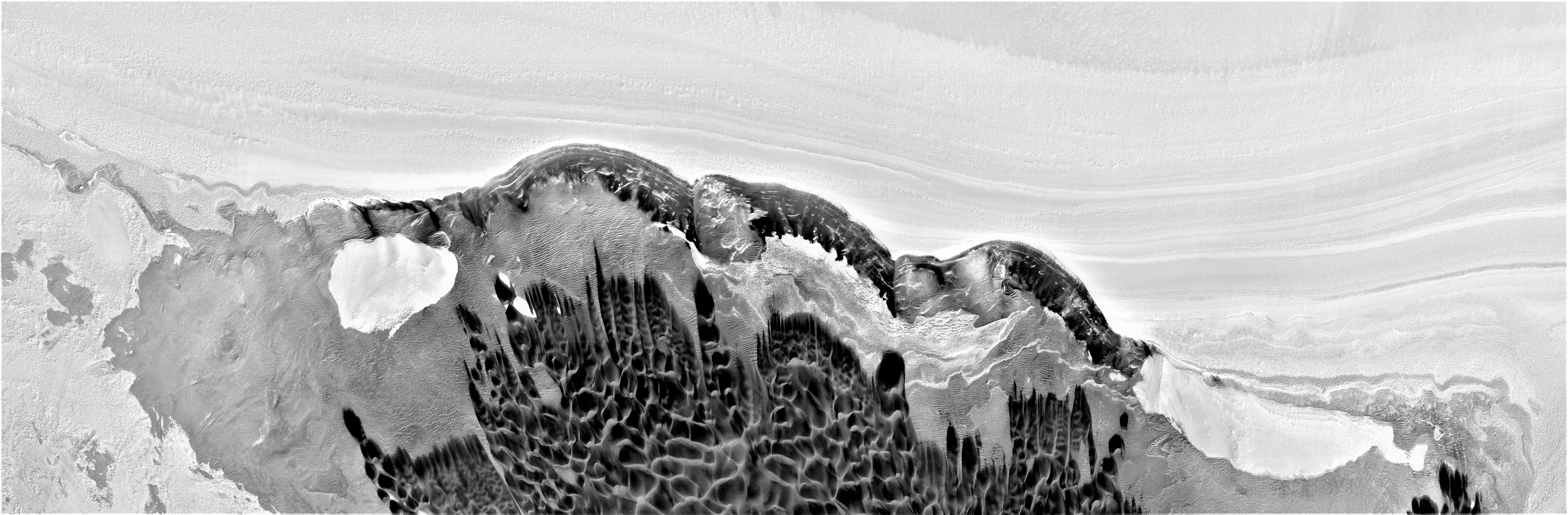
Abalos Undae dunes with brightness adjusted

== See also ==
- Classical albedo features on Mars
- Hagal dune field
- Nili Patera dune field
- Hyperboreae Undae
- Aspledon Undae
- Ogygis Undae
