= Siton Undae =

Martian dune field

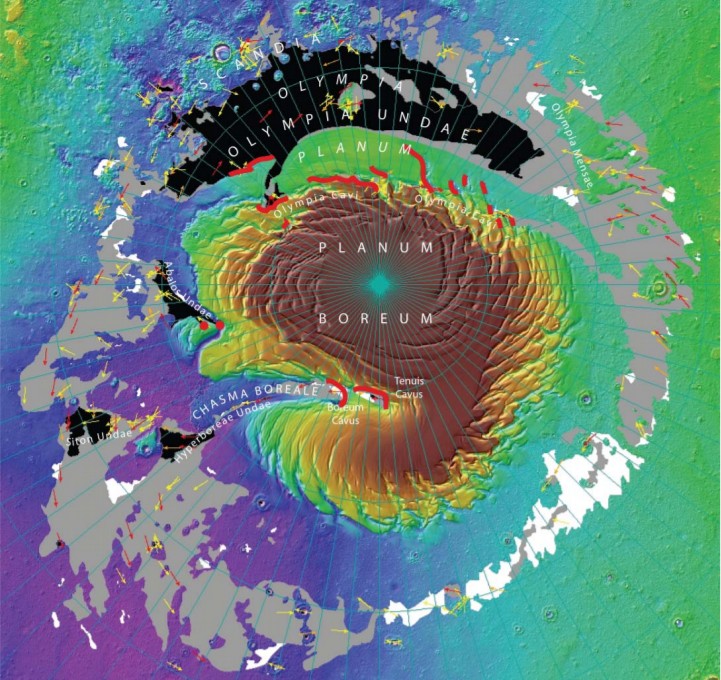
Stereographic projection map showing the density distribution of dune fields in the Planum Boreum region. The grey regions are lower density fields. The four densest dune fields are shown in black. The prime meridian is at the bottom of the map. Siton Undae is shown on the southernmost black patch left, between longitude 291.38°E to 301.4°E (43.98°W – 57.08°W).

Siton Undae is one of the largest and densest dune fields in the vicinity of Planum Boreum, the Martian northern polar ice-cap. It is named after one of the classical albedo features on Mars. Its name was officially approved by IAU on 20 March 2007. It extends from latitude 73.79°N to 77.5°N and from longitude 291.38°E to 301.4°E (43.98°W – 57.08°W). Its centre is located at latitude 75.55°N, longitude 297.28E (62.72°W), and has a diameter of 222.97 kilometres (138.55 mi).

Siton Undae is part of a cluster of sand-seas (undae), which along with Hyperboreae, and Abalos Undae, overlay the lowlands of Vastitas Borealis. Siton Undae superposes the deepest basin of the northern region of Mars and contains amorphous silica-coated glass-rich dunes. It is theorised that the formation of Siton Undae may have occurred during early erosion incidents of the Planum Boreum cavi unit, and that Rupes Tenuis may also have been a sand source, although it is now depleted. Other dune fields sharing the same formation history include Olympia and Aspledon Undae.

Siton Undae is the southernmost of the densest northern circumpolar dune fields and its presence indicates effective sand transport and accumulation from sand sources to the north and west. Siton Undae, along with Abalos, and Hyperboreae Undae, is also a tributary to less dense dune fields that continue all the way to the Martian prime meridian.

== Dune characteristics ==
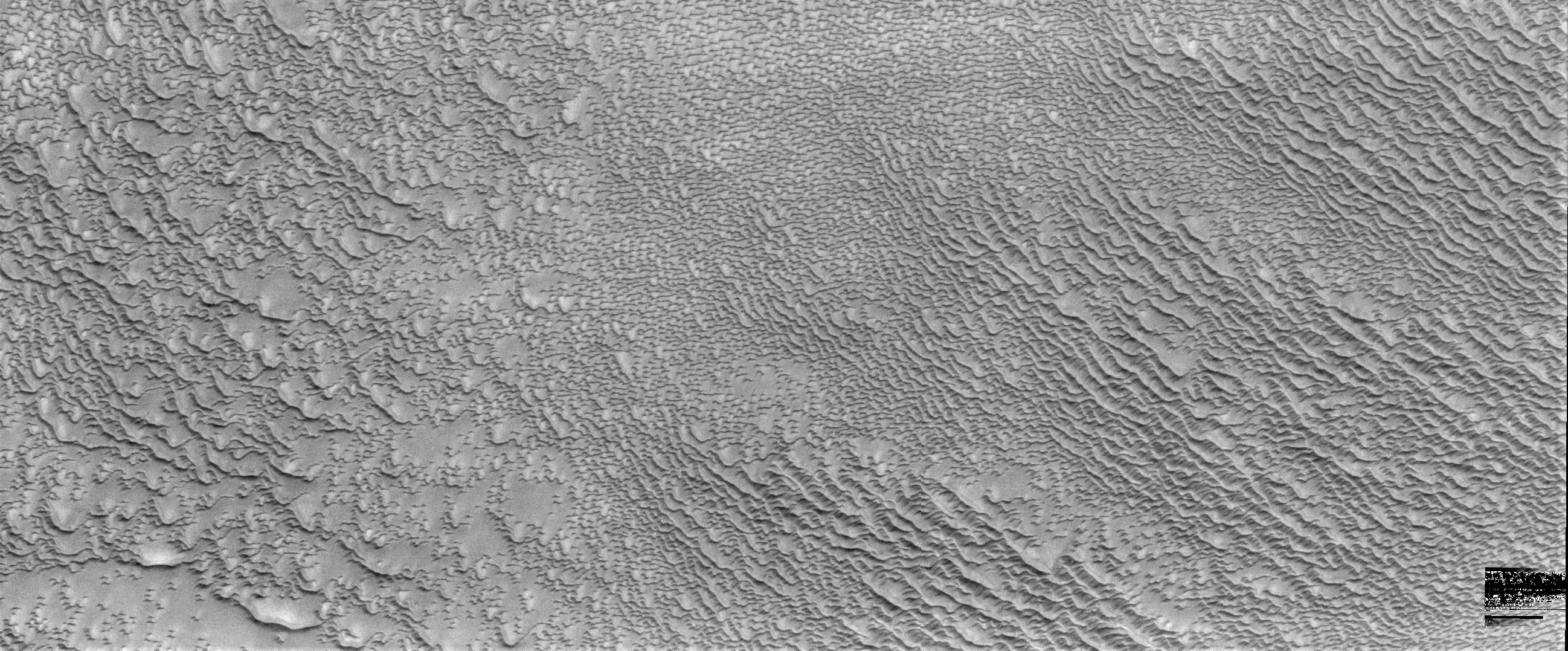
Siton Undae

Spectral analysis of the dunes of the circumpolar ergs, including Siton Undae, using the OMEGA instrument on board the European Mars Express orbiter, indicates that 80 to 90 percent of these sands are composed of volcanic glass produced by eruptions of volcanoes situated in Martian glaciers. These ratios of glass and crystalline material are similar to those obtained in Iceland from eruptions of volcanoes below the ice. It is also theorised that significant amounts of granular glass may have been transferred to Vastitas Borealis, and Siton Undae, by catastrophic floods originating from Chryse Planitia, Valles Marineris, Juventae Chasma, and the southern Acidalia region of Mars.

The dunes of Siton Undae contain amorphous silica-coated glass-rich sand. The lack of evidence for the presence of volcanoes in the region of Planum Boreum, as well as the absence of evidence of any large-scale melt deposits due to crater impact, suggests that these silica-coated deposits may have formed by alteration of the basaltic sands through acidic action. Further, it is theorised that acidic alteration of glassy deposits may have been a common conversion mechanism on Mars, especially at high latitudes.

== Images from THEMIS ==
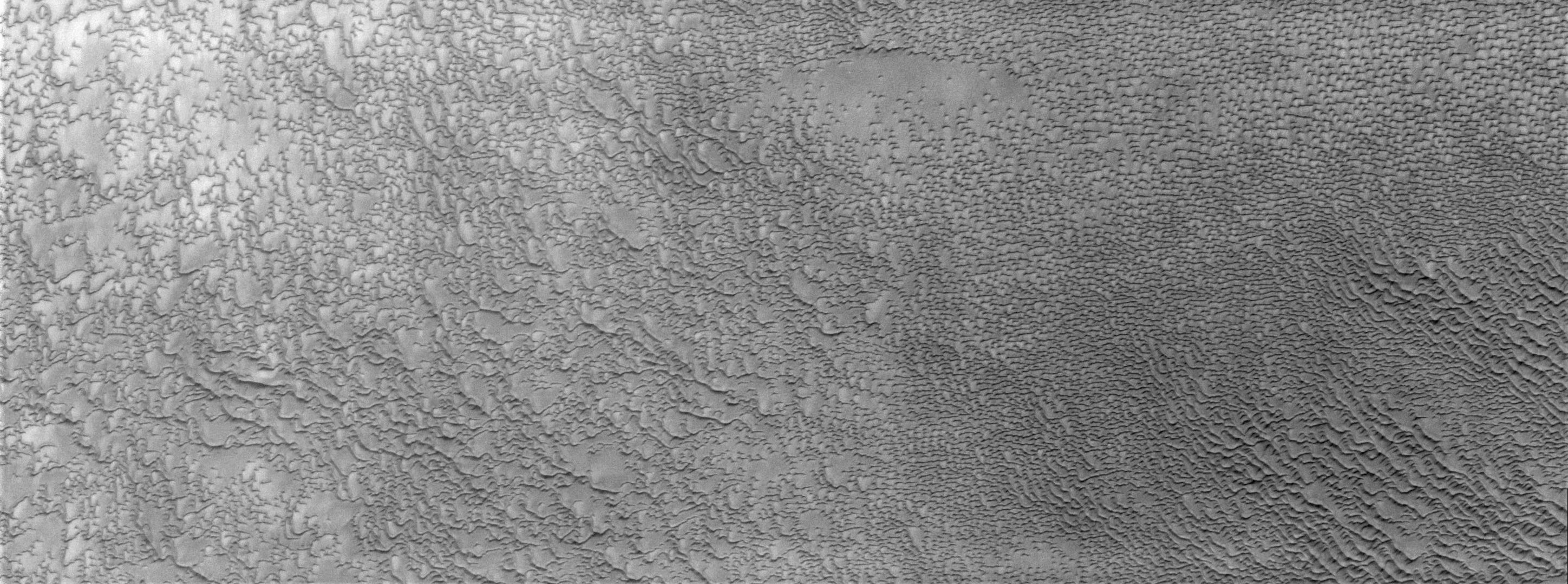
Dunes of Siton Undae from NASA's Thermal Emission Imaging System (THEMIS)

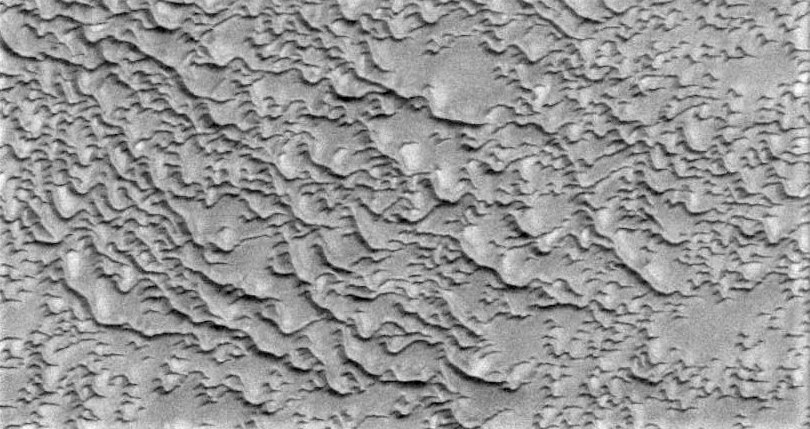
Siton Undae close up from NASA's Thermal Emission Imaging System (THEMIS)

== See also ==
- Hagal dune field
- Nili Patera dune field
- Ogygis Undae
