= Aspledon Undae =

Martian dune field

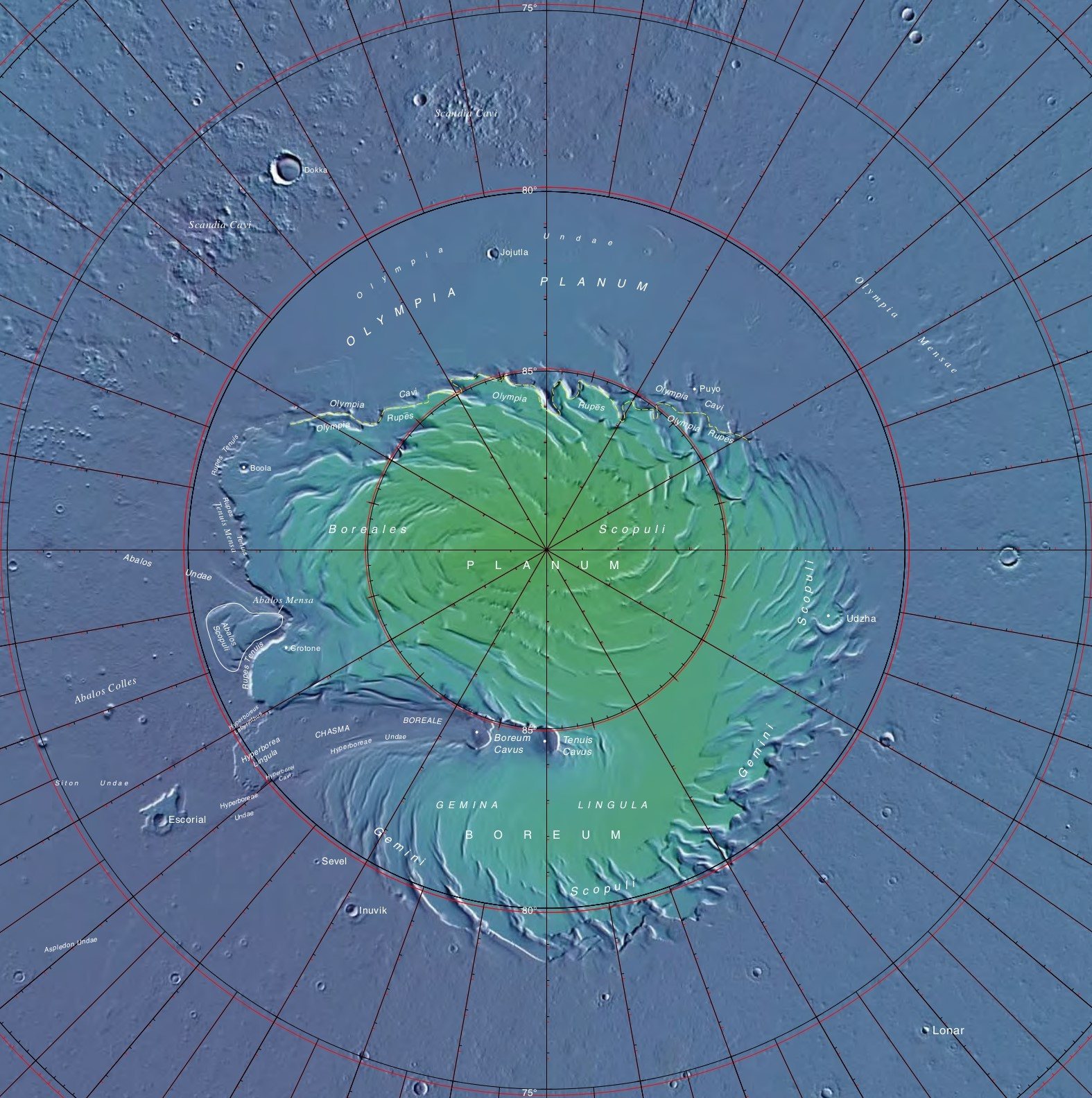
USGS map showing the location of Aspledon Undae in Planum Boreum. The prime meridian is at the bottom of the map. Aspledon Undae is shown on the southernmost black patch left, between longitude 291.38°E to 301.4°E (43.98°W – 57.08°W).

Aspledon Undae is one of the named northern circumpolar dune fields in the vicinity of Planum Boreum, the Martian North pole. It is named after one of the classical albedo features on Mars. Its name was officially approved by the International Astronomical Union (IAU) on 20 March 2007. Its name is Greek, and derives from the name of a town in Boeotia, Ancient Greece, which, in turn, took its name from Aspledon (Ancient Greek: Ασπληδών), son of Poseidon, the ancient Greek god of the sea. The dunes of Aspledon Undae extend from latitude 71.47°N to 75.14°N and from longitude 305.83°E to 315.04°E (44.96°W – 54.17°W). Its centre is located at latitude 73.06°N, longitude 309.65°E (50.35°W), and has a diameter of 215.2 km.

Aspledon Undae is the southernmost of the albedo-named dune fields of Planum Boreum, and lies to the south of Hyperboreae Undae and southeast of Siton Undae. It is theorised that the formation of Aspledon Undae may have occurred during early erosion incidents of the Planum Boreum cavi unit, and that Rupes Tenuis may have also been a sand source, although it is now depleted. Other dune fields sharing the same formation history include Olympia and Siton Undae. Aspledon Undae, along with Hyperboreae, Siton, Olympia, and Alalos Undae is one of the five named northern circumpolar dune fields. However, unlike the other four, it is not one of the densest. The dune field of Aspledon Undae, along with those of Siton, Hyperboreae, and Abalos Undae, overlays the lowlands of Vastitas Borealis. Aspledon Undae has been imaged by NASA's 2001 Mars Odyssey robotic spacecraft using the Thermal Emission Imaging System (THEMIS) camera on board the spacecraft.

== Formation ==
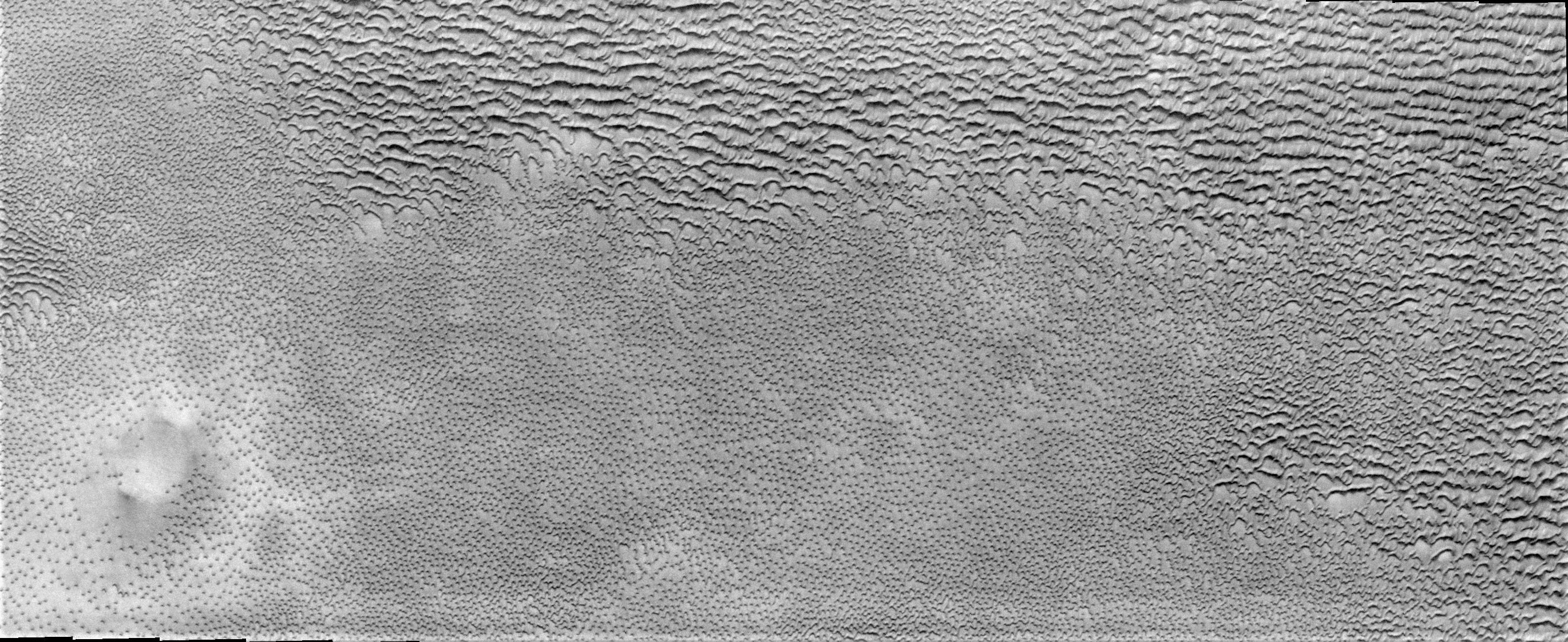
Aspledon Undae, a dune field near the Martian north pole. The bottom side of the image shows hundreds of small, isolated dunes. On the top side, these small dunes appear to have coalesced into larger dune forms.

According to Tanaka et al., Planum Boreum lies on two major basal units: The Rupes Tenuis unit and the Planum Boreum Cavi unit. The age of the Rupes Tenuis unit is early Amazonian, while the Planum Boreum Cavi unit overlays the Rupes Tenuis unit, and its age is Middle to Late Amazonian. The Olympia Undae unit may have formed during early denudation incidents of the Planum Boreum Cavi unit in its immediate neighbourhood. More distant dune fields from the Planum Boreum Cavi unit, such as Siton, Aspledon, and a large portion of Olympia Undae may have formed during earlier erosional events of the Planum Boreum Cavi unit. Other sources to these dune fields may include Rupes Tenuis, although this source is now considered to be exhausted.

== See also ==
- Hagal dune field
- Nili Patera dune field
- Ogygis Undae
