= Ogygis Undae =

Martian dune field

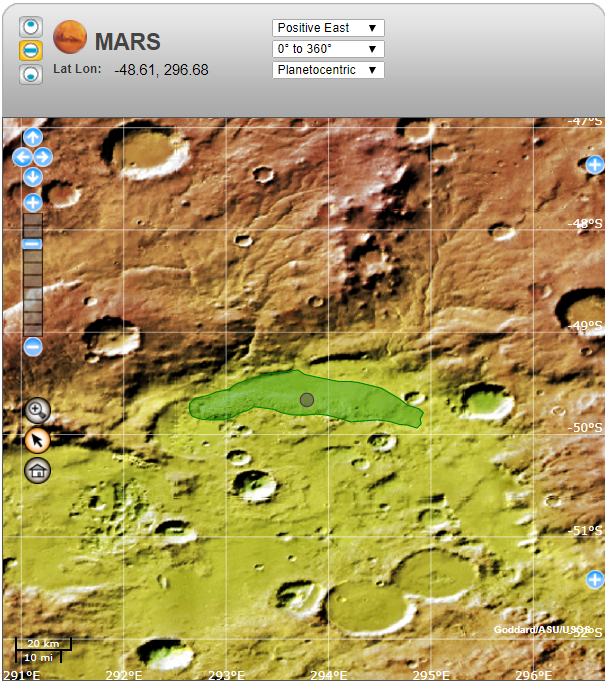
USGS map showing the location of Ogygis Undae on Mars

Ogygis Undae is the only named southern hemisphere dune field on Mars. It is named after one of the classical albedo features on Mars, Ogygis Regio. Its name, which refers to Ogyges, a primeval mythological ruler in ancient Greece, was officially approved by the International Astronomical Union (IAU) on September 17, 2015. It is situated just outside Argyre Planitia, a plain located in the southern highlands of Mars. The dunes of Ogygis Undae extend from latitude −49.94°N to −49.37°N and from longitude 292.64°E to 294.93°E (65.07°W – 67.36°W). They are centered at latitude −49.66°N, longitude 293.79°E (66.21°W), and extend approximately 87 km to the east and west from there. Ogygis Undae has an area of 1904 km^{2}, and due to its large size is a primary subject for research on Martian dune morphology and sand composition.

== Morphology ==
Ogygis Undae is the final sink of an extended sand transport system that was imaged with the HRSC camera onboard ESA Mars Express. The complexity of this transport system is as extensive as some terrestrial examples. Dunes in Ogygis Undae have several morphologies including: barhcan, barchanoid, dome and star dunes. The variety of dune types indicates that they were deposited in a multimodal wind regime with different winds converging into the basin where the dunes are located, carrying sand from multiple source areas. The morphological complexity is mirrored by the diverse mineral composition of the dune-forming sediment.

== Composition ==
Mineral distribution across the dune fields of Ogygis Undae is non-uniform and bimodal. The relative juxtaposition of the two primary grain types reveals how Aeolian processes affect the transport of sand on the surface of Mars. Compositional spectra were acquired and analyzed in 2016 by USGS scientists using both the Thermal Emission Spectrometer (TES) instrument on board Mars Global Surveyor and the Thermal Emission Imaging System (THEMIS) on board the 2001 Mars Odyssey spacecraft. Other characteristics of Ogygis Undae, such as its nocturnal thermal inertia values, corroborate the finding that there is a bimodal sand-type distribution across the field.

Thermal emission spectroscopy results from the large dune field located inside Gale Crater were used as a reference for data obtained from Ogygis Undae because the features of Gale Crater were investigated extensively both by orbiting spacecraft and on site by the NASA Mars rover, Curiosity, a part of the Mars Science Laboratory (MSL) mission. Ogygis Undae differs from the Gale dune field in both sand-type composition and homogeneity, indicating differences in both the types of sources for these dune fields as well as the distance from their respective sand-sources. The USGS investigators also noted that the dunes of Ogygis Undae look similar to the dunes in Grand Falls, Arizona.

== See also ==
- Abalos Undae
- Aspledon Undae
- Hagal dune field
- Hyperboreae Undae
- Nili Patera dune field
- Olympia Undae
- Siton Undae
