= Olympia Undae =

Martian dune field

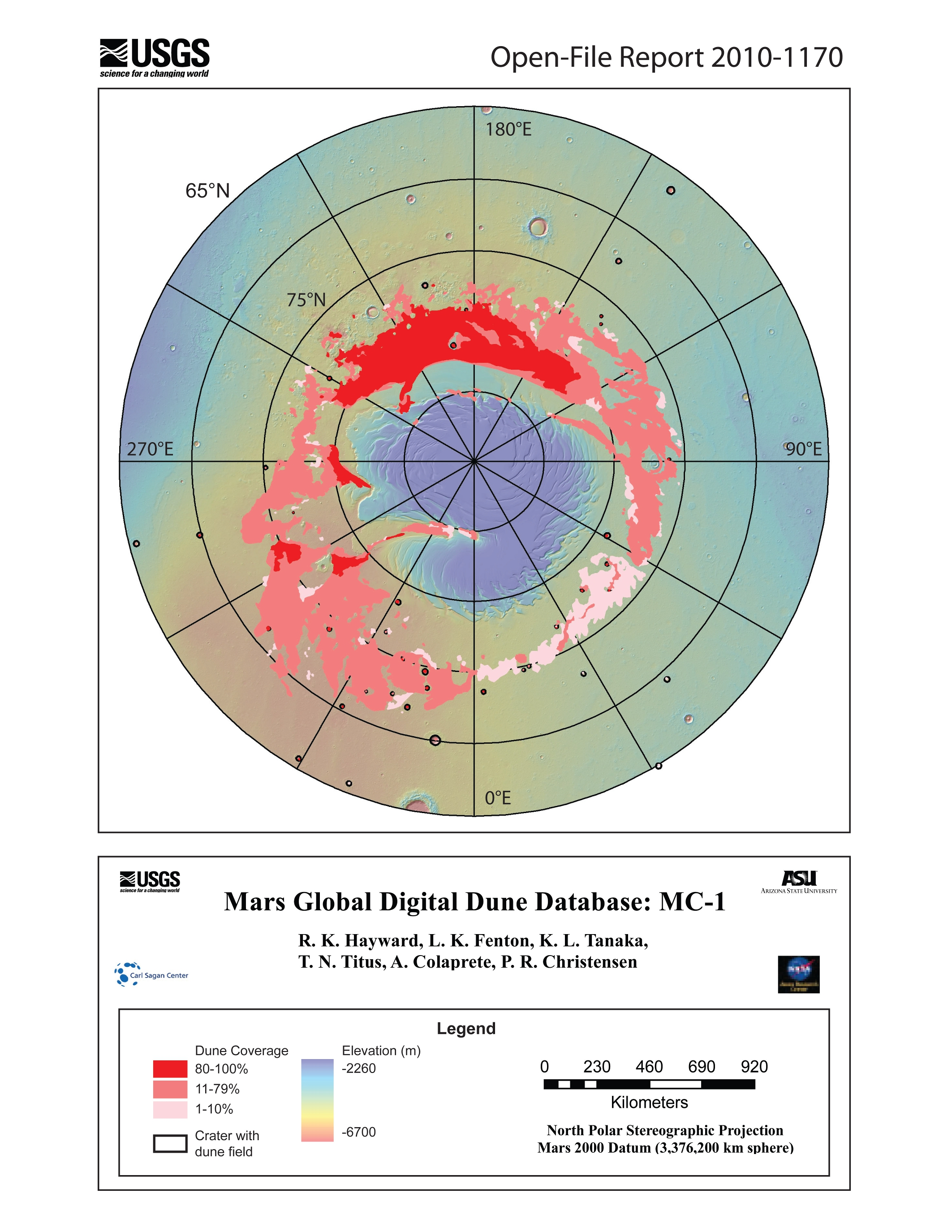
Mars Global Digital Dune Database MC-1 map showing the North Polar Sand Sea. Olympia Undae is the area with dune coverage between 120° and 240°E longitude.

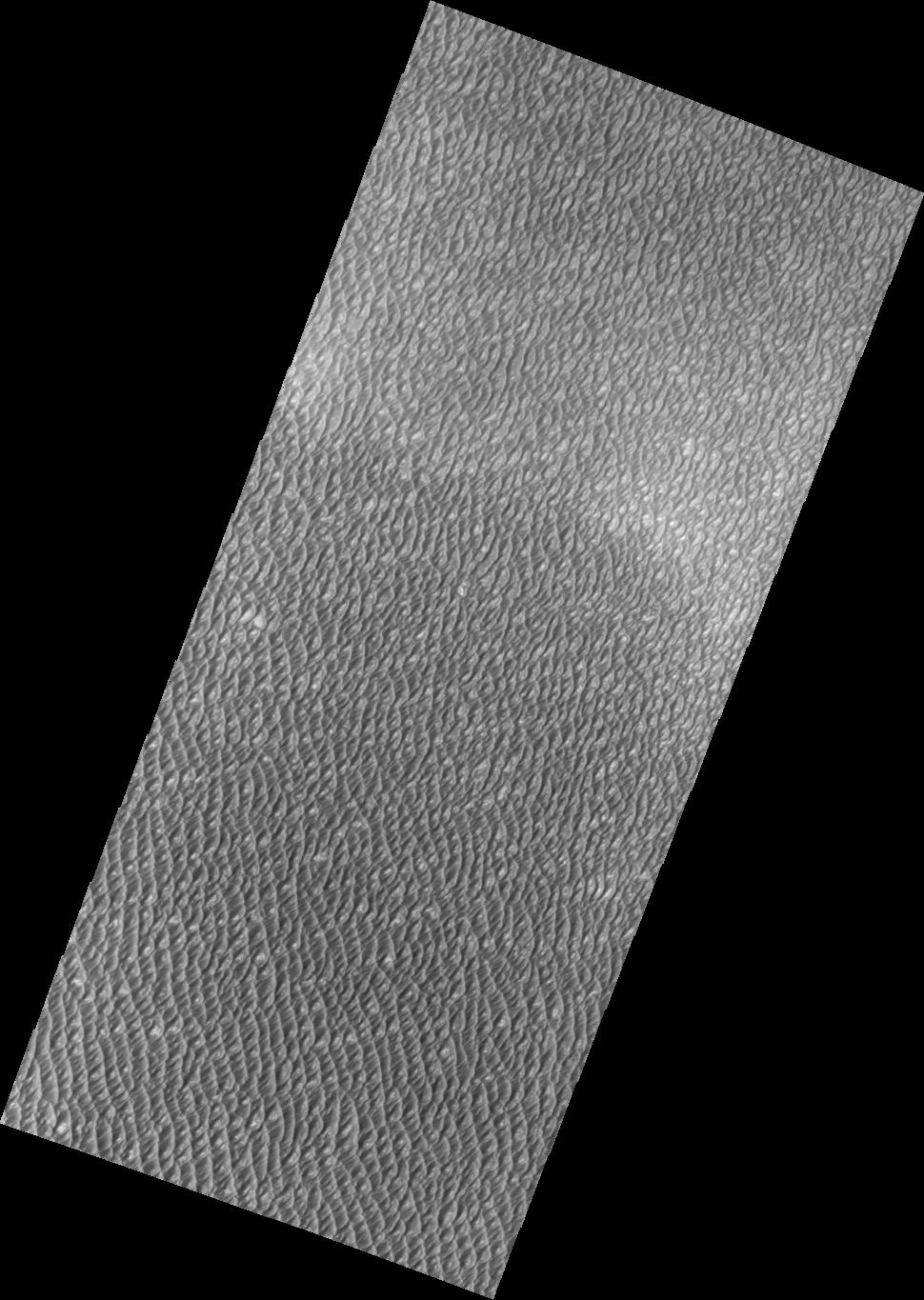
Olympia Undae is the largest field of sand dunes on the planet Mars.

Olympia Undae is a vast dune field in the north polar region of the planet Mars. It consists of a broad "sand sea" or erg that partly rings the north polar plateau (Planum Boreum) from about 120° to 240°E longitude and 78° to 83°N latitude. Stretching about 1,100 km (680 mi) across and covering an area of 470,000 km^{2}, Olympia Undae is the largest continuous dune field on Mars. It is similar in size to the Rub' Al Khali in the Arabian Peninsula, the largest active erg on Earth.

Olympia Undae lies within the informally named Borealis basin (also called the north polar basin), the largest of three topographic basins that occur in the northern lowlands of Mars. The average elevation in Olympia Undae is about 4,250 m below datum (martian "sea" level). The 19-km-diameter crater Jojutla lies near the geographic center of Olympia Undae at 81.63°N latitude and 169.65°E longitude. This crater was named by Andres Eloy Martinez Rojas, Mexican astronomer and science writer.

Unda (pl. undae) is a Latin term meaning water, particularly water in motion as waves. The International Astronomical Union (IAU) adopted the term to describe "undulatory," dune-like features on other planets. Olympia Undae contains a variety of dune forms and wind-related (aeolian) depositional features, including sand sheets, transverse dunes, simple barchan dunes, mega-barchans, and complex barchanoid ridges. All of these dune types occur on Earth too.

Barchans are isolated, crescent-shaped dunes with horns that point downwind. They occur is areas where sand supply is moderate to low. Small simple barchan dunes and large mega-barchans are common at the margins of Olympia Undae and in areas where the sand cover is thin. Barchanoid ridges are broad linear to sinuous sand accumulations. They form through the lateral coalition of individual barchans and indicate increasing sand supply. Where sand is abundant, transverse dunes occur; they are commonly defined as long barchaoid ridges with fairly straight segments that are perpendicular to the wind direction. The majority of dunes in Olympia Undae are transverse dunes. Their spacing ranges from 200 to 800 m apart crest to crest, and comparison to terrestrial dunes with similar spacing indicates that they are 10 to 25 m high.

On Earth, dunes are produced by saltating grains of sand. The requirement that dunes are produced by saltation allows scientists to determine the likely grain size for the particles making up the dunes in Olympia Undae and other martian dune fields. On Mars, the particle size most easily moved by wind is about 100 μm in diameter (fine sand). The sand in Olympia Undae is extremely dark in color and probably consists of basaltic rock fragments. The surface of Olympia Undae has a strong TES Type 2 spectral signature, indicating that the surface materials consist of basaltic andesite or weathered basalt and/or basaltic glass.

In 2005, the OMEGA instrument on the Mars Express orbiter detected high concentrations of gypsum in the eastern portion of Olympia Undae (centered at 244.5°E, 80.2°N). CRISM data from the Mars Reconnaissance Orbiter (MRO) suggests that the gypsum is more concentrated along the crests of dunes than in the interdune hollows. The source of the gypsum is uncertain. Gypsum is an evaporitic mineral that precipitates from saline water; thus, its presence may indicate conditions different from today’s martian environment. The mineral may have formed through the melting of acidic snow, or the melting and discharge of sulfur-rich water from the base of the polar ice cap. However, the presence of gypsum does not necessarily require large surface water bodies (e.g., playa lakes). The mineral could have formed in volcanically heated groundwater in the shallow subsurface and later been exposed and concentrated by wind erosion and winnowing ("eolian mining").

The term Olympia Undae can be the source of some confusion among Mars researchers. The term is used to describe 1) the geographical area described above and the type area for 2) a stratigraphic or geologic map unit (e.g. formation) called the Olympia Undae unit. As a stratigraphic unit, Olympia Undae describes materials that make up the geographic Olympia Undae as well as other sand sheets and dune fields encircling Planum Boreum (e.g., Abalos Undae). The Olympia Undae unit is Amazonian in age. To address some of this confusion, the stratigraphic term Olympia Undae unit has recently been renamed to simply "undae unit," since it encompasses other named dune fields (undae) around Planum Boreum. Another possible source of confusion is the distinction between Olympia Undae and Olympia Planum (formerly, Olympia Planitia). As a geographic area, Olympia Undae refers to the erg that covers a large fraction of Olympia Planum between longitude 120° and 240°E. Olympia Undae and Olympia Planum are not interchangeable terms. Olympia Planum is a broad, plain (and topographic bench) adjacent to Planum Boreum. It is half-domed shaped in profile (cross-section) and slopes southward into the Vastitas Borealis. The Olympia Undae erg covers both the bulk of southern Olympia Planum and part of the northern Vastitas Borealis.

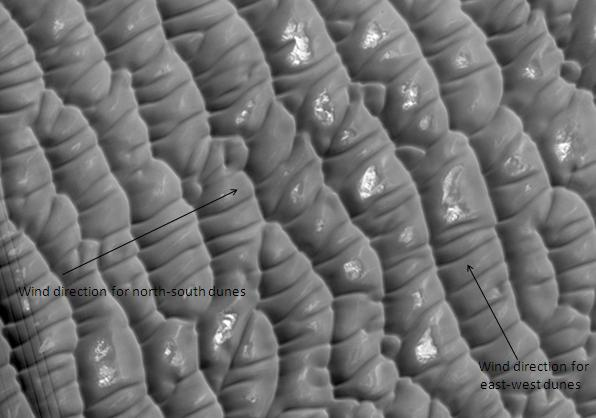
Olympia Undae dunes, as seen by HiRISE. Two sets of transverse dunes are visible, indicating varying wind direction. Olympia Undae is also known as the North Polar Erg.

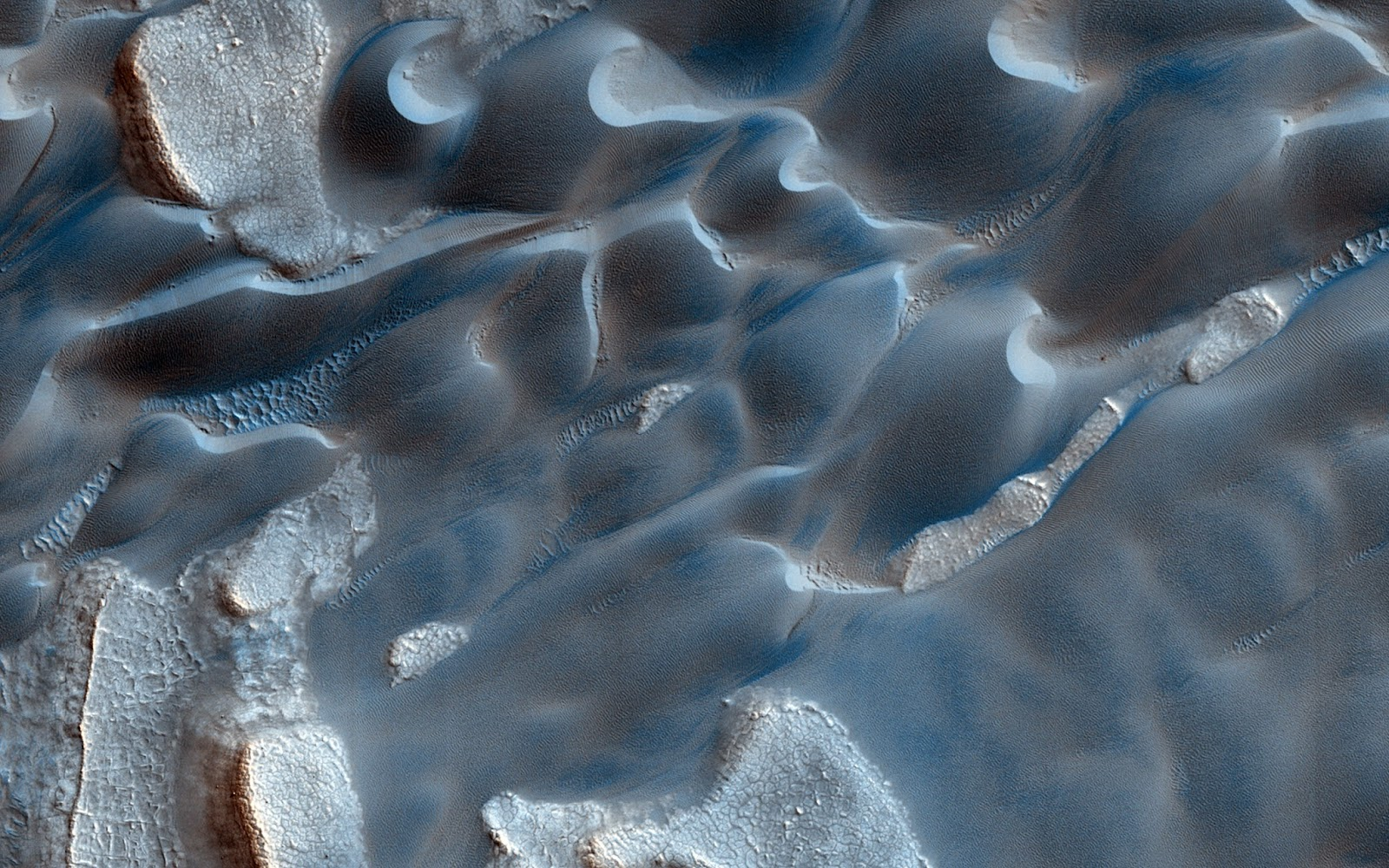
Closeup, color-enhanced image of Olympia Undae dunes with melting/subliming ice-cap fragments. Note Barchan dunes and patterned ground. Width of image is about 1 km/3000 ft.

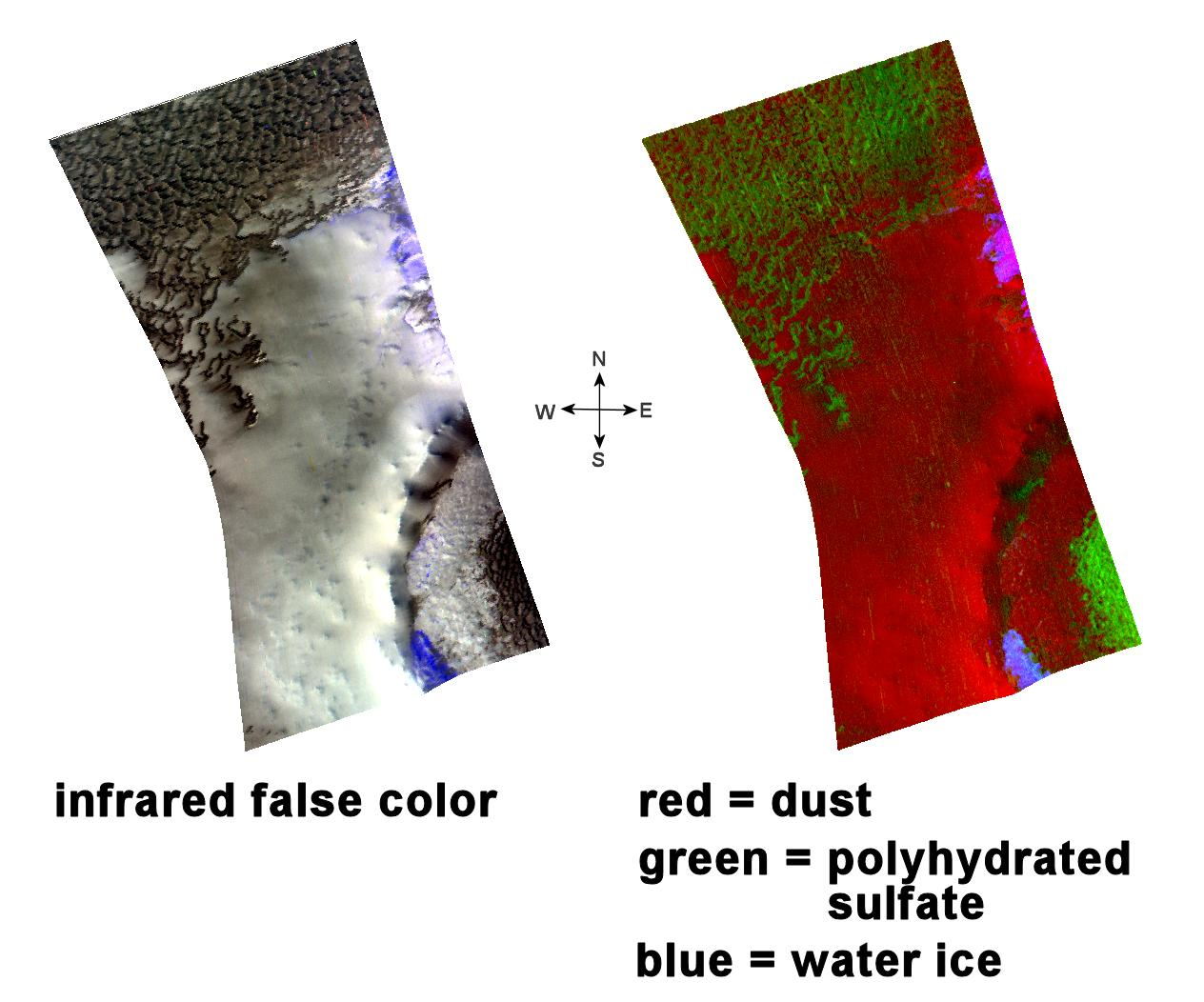
CRISM spectral signal for gypsum (polyhydrated sulfates) in Olympia Undae dunes.

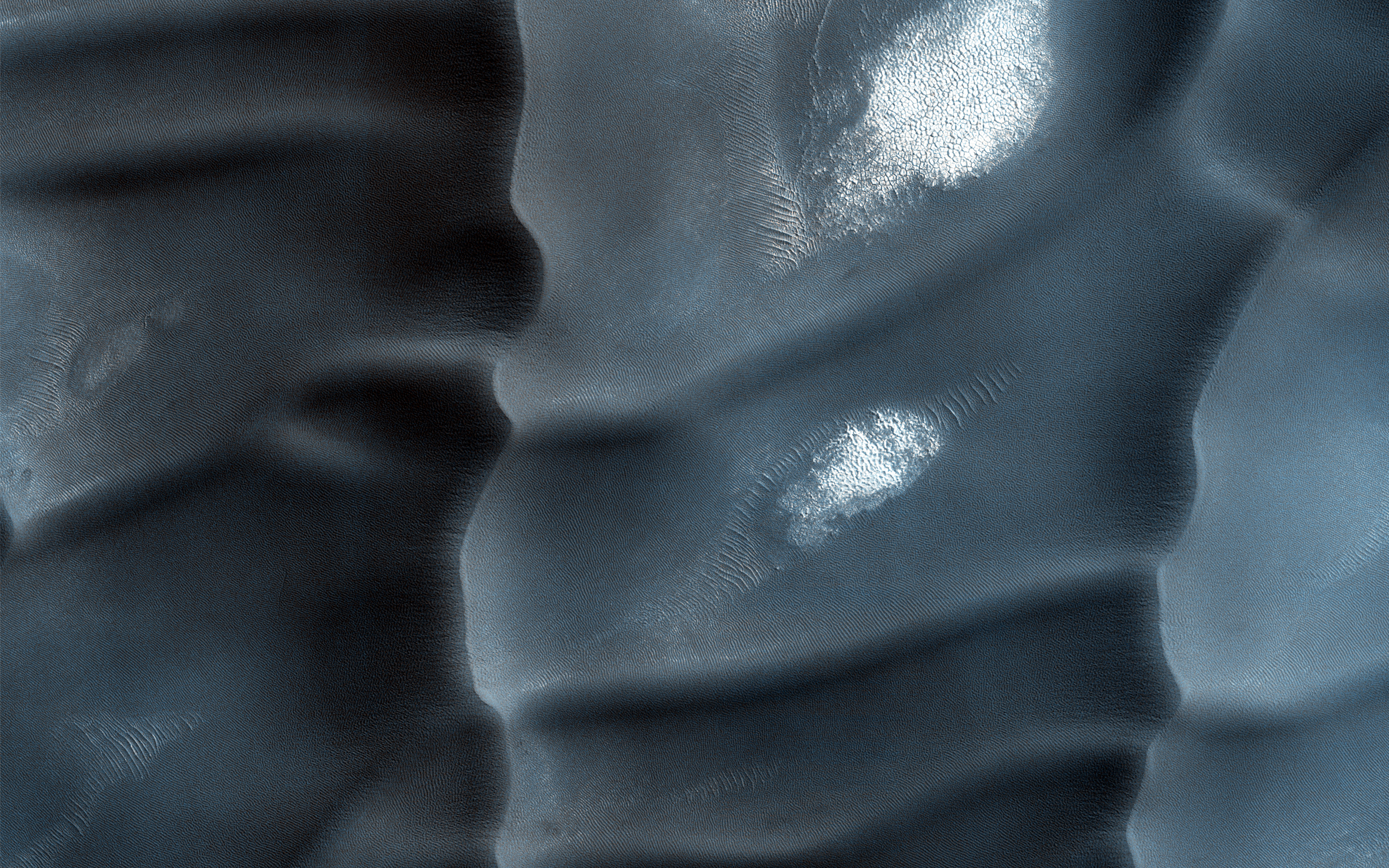
North Polar Gypsum Dunes in Olympia Undae.

== See also ==
- Siton Undae
- Hyperboreae Undae
- Aspledon Undae
- Ogygis Undae
