= Mare Australe quadrangle =

Map of Mars

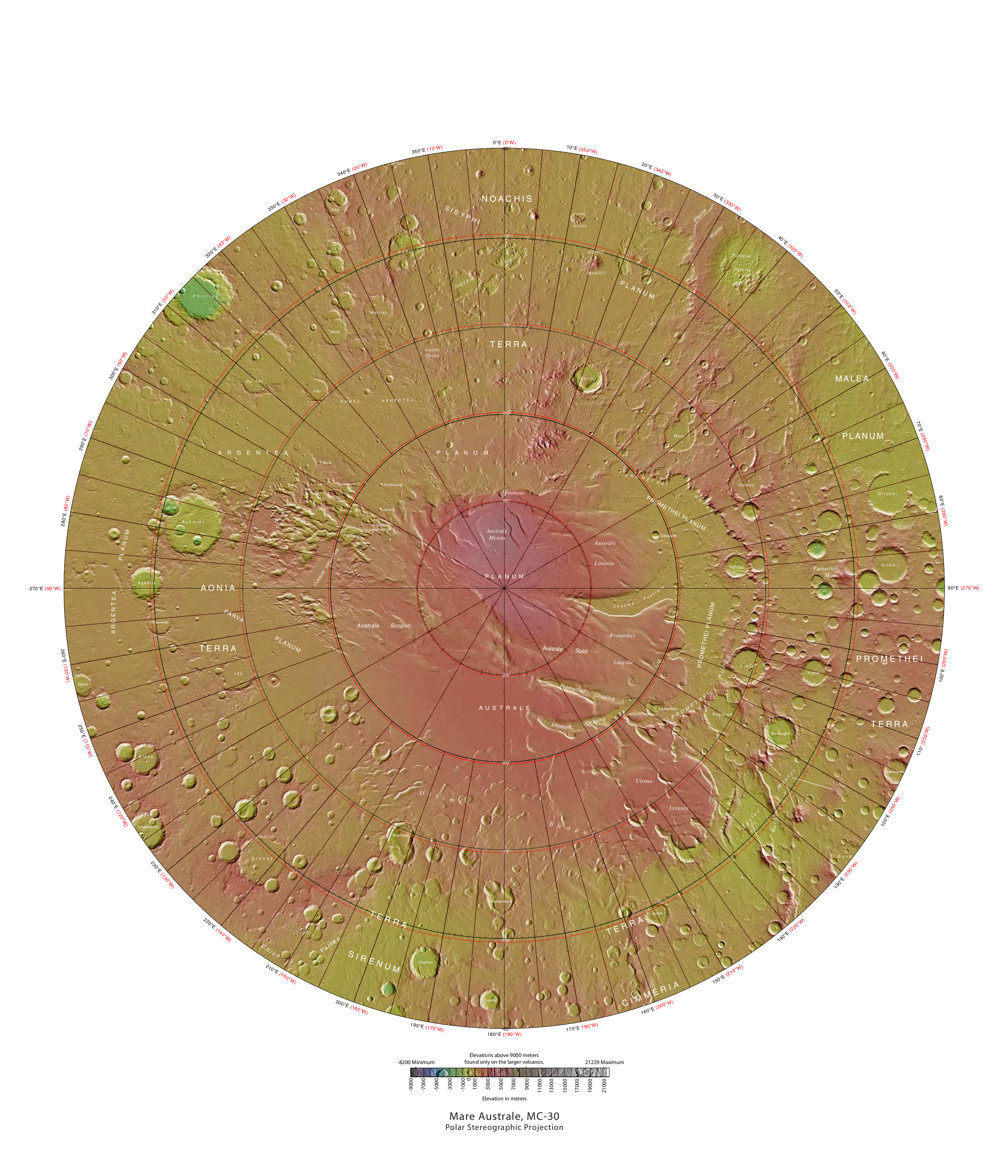
- Map of Mare Australe quadrangle from Mars Orbiter Laser Altimeter (MOLA) data. The highest elevations are red and the lowest are blue.
- Coordinates: 75°S 0°E

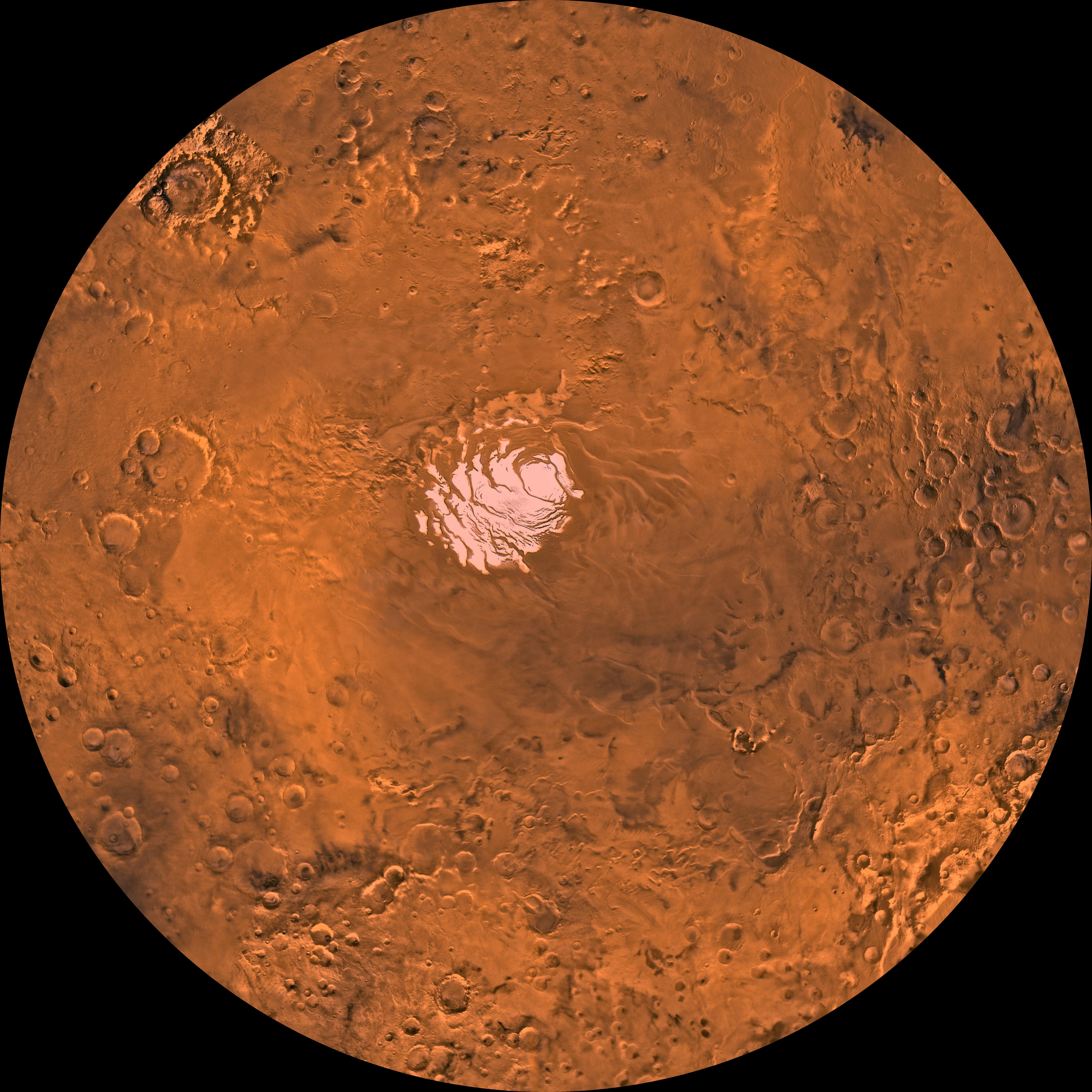
Image of the Mare Australe Quadrangle (MC-30). The region includes the South Polar ice cap. The central part is mainly a permanent residual ice cap surrounded by layered and troughed terrain which is, in turn, encircled by heavily cratered terrain.

The Mare Australe quadrangle is one of a series of 30 quadrangle maps of Mars used by the United States Geological Survey (USGS) Astrogeology Research Program. The Mare Australe quadrangle is also referred to as MC-30 (Mars Chart-30). The quadrangle covers all the area of Mars south of 65°, including the South polar ice cap, and its surrounding area. The quadrangle's name derives from an older name for a feature that is now called Planum Australe, a large plain surrounding the polar cap. The Mars polar lander crash landed in this region.

== Notable features ==
Around the southern ice cap is a surface, called the Dorsa Argentea Formation that may be an old ice-rich deposit. It contains a group of sinuous, branched ridges that resembles eskers that form when streams are under glaciers. The formation often contains pits: two major locations are named Cavi Angusti and Cavi Sisyphi. The pits have steep sides and an irregular shape. They are up to 50 km across and 1 km deep.

The quadrangle also contains Angustus Labyrinthus, a formation of intersecting valley or ridges, nicknamed the "Inca City". Researchers were surprised to see parts of the surface having a Swiss-cheese appearance. Also, some areas showed strange spider-shaped forms, which were determined to be caused by carbon dioxide gas blowing dust around at certain times of the year.

Some craters in Mare Australe show gullies. Martian gullies are small, incised networks of narrow channels and their associated downslope sediment deposits, found on the planet of Mars. They are named for their resemblance to terrestrial gullies. First discovered on images from Mars Global Surveyor, they occur on steep slopes, especially on the walls of craters. Usually, each gully has a dendritic alcove at its head, a fan-shaped apron at its base, and a single thread of incised channel linking the two, giving the whole gully an hourglass shape. They are believed to be relatively young because they have few, if any craters. A subclass of gullies is also found cut into the faces of sand dunes which themselves considered to be quite young. On the basis of their form, aspects, positions, and location amongst and apparent interaction with features thought to be rich in water ice, many researchers believed that the processes carving the gullies involve liquid water. However, this remains a topic of active research. As soon as gullies were discovered, researchers began to image many gullies over and over, looking for possible changes. By 2006, some changes were found. Later, with further analysis it was determined that the changes could have occurred by dry granular flows rather than being driven by flowing water. With continued observations many more changes were found in Gasa Crater and others. With more repeated observations, more and more changes have been found; since the changes occur in the winter and spring, experts are tending to believe that gullies were formed from dry ice. Before-and-after images demonstrated the timing of this activity coincided with seasonal carbon-dioxide frost and temperatures that would not have allowed for liquid water. When dry ice frost changes to a gas, it may lubricate dry material to flow especially on steep slopes. In some years frost, perhaps as thick as 1 meter.

South polar layered deposits (SPLD) are the permanent, underlying geological structure, primarily made of water ice with dust. In contrast, the Mars ice cap is a seasonal layer of carbon dioxide (CO2) frost that forms on top of the SPLD in the winter. The SPLD is much thicker, contains layered deposits that have accumulated over millions of years, and includes buried CO2 ice. The ice cap is a thin, transient CO2 coating that sublimates in the summer.

== Liquid water ==
Scientists reported in July 2018, the discovery of a lake of liquid water under the southern ice cap. The measurements were gathered with the Mars Advanced Radar for Subsurface and Ionosphere Sounding (MARSIS) on board the European Space Agency's orbiting Mars Express spacecraft. Radar reflections showed a bright spot in the ice layers that analysis later showed that it had to be a lake of liquid water. It is believed that the water remains liquid, even at the temperature of -68 degrees Celsius because there is likely much dissolved salt that lowers the freezing point. The lake is about 20 kilometers across and at least 10 centimeters deep It could contain 10 billion liters of liquid water. There could very well be many small bodies of water under the ice cap; however, they are difficult to detect with MARSIS. Also, the raw date coverage needed for these detections is limited—only a few percent of the area has a full set of data.

== Dorsa Argentea Formation ==
The Dorsa Argentea Formation (DAF) is thought to be a large system of eskers that were under an ancient ice cap in the south polar region of Mars. This large polar ice sheet is believed to have covered about 1.5 million square kilometers. That area is twice the area of the state of Texas. The ice sheet formed near the boundary of the Noachian-Hesperian era and receded in the early Hesperian era. A thick ice sheet was able to be formed more easily in the south polar region than in the North pole because the south pole is higher in altitude. There may have been much more water available in the Martian atmosphere when the ice sheet developed.

This group of ridges extends from 270–100 E and 70–90 S, around the south pole of Mars. It sits under the Late Amazonian South Polar Layered Deposits (SPLD). The amount of these ridges is huge, one study studied seven different ridge systems which contained almost 4,000 ridges that had a total length 51,000 km.

Most eskers are thought to be formed inside ice-walled tunnels by streams which flowed within and under glaciers. After the retaining ice walls melted away, stream deposits remained as long winding ridges.

MARSIS radar data suggest that significant areas of layered, potentially ice-rich parts of the Dorsa Argentea Formation remain today.

A team of researchers used an early Mars global climate model together with the University of Maine Ice Sheet Model to determine how the eskers formed. They concluded that to get enough a high enough temperature in the Martian atmosphere to form the ice sheet, a greenhouse gas in addition to a thicker carbon dioxide atmosphere was needed to warm the surface near the poles by at least 20 degrees C. Also, to produce the shape of the ice sheet, at least part of the Tharsis volcanoes needed to be present.

== Potential ocean ==
Strong evidence for a one time ancient ocean was found from data gathered from the north and south poles. In March 2015, a team of scientists published results showing that this region was highly enriched with deuterium, heavy hydrogen, by seven times as much as the Earth. This means that Mars has lost a volume of water 6.5 times what is stored in today's polar caps. The water for a time would have formed an ocean in the low-lying Mare Boreum. The amount of water could have covered the planet about 140 meters, but was probably in an ocean that in places would be almost 1 mile deep.

This international team used ESO’s Very Large Telescope, along with instruments at the W. M. Keck Observatory and the NASA Infrared Telescope Facility, to map out different forms of water in Mars’s atmosphere over a six-year period.

- Climate of Mars
- Dust Devil Tracks
- HiRISE
- Impact crater
- List of quadrangles on Mars
- Martian polar ice caps
- Swiss cheese features
- Geyser (Mars)
- Water on Mars
- Martian Gullies

MC-01 Mare Boreum (features)
MC-02 Diacria (features)		MC-03 Arcadia (features)	MC-04 Acidalium (features)	MC-05 Ismenius Lacus (features)		MC-06 Casius (features)	MC-07 Cebrenia (features)
MC-08 Amazonis (features)	MC-09 Tharsis (features)	MC-10 Lunae Palus (features)	MC-11 Oxia Palus (features)	MC-12 Arabia (features)	MC-13 Syrtis Major (features)	MC-14 Amenthes (features)	MC-15 Elysium (features)
MC-16 Memnonia (features)	MC-17 Phoenicis Lacus (features)	MC-18 Coprates (features)	MC-19 Margaritifer Sinus (features)	MC-20 Sinus Sabaeus (features)	MC-21 Iapygia (features)	MC-22 Mare Tyrrhenum (features)	MC-23 Aeolis (features)
MC-24 Phaethontis (features)		MC-25 Thaumasia (features)	MC-26 Argyre (features)	MC-27 Noachis (features)		MC-28 Hellas (features)	MC-29 Eridania (features)
MC-30 Mare Australe (features)
