= McMurdo (crater) =

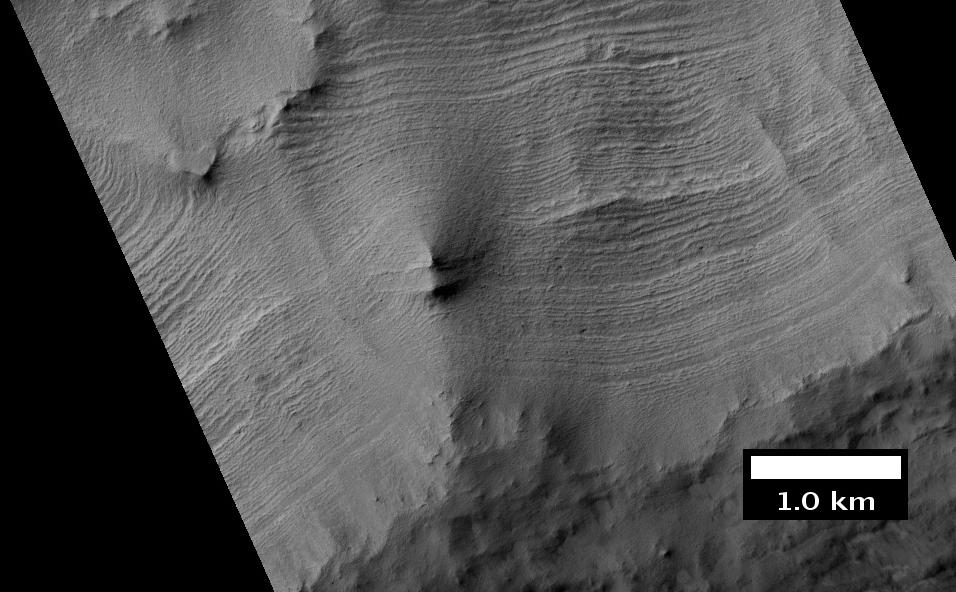
- Close-up of Layers in wall of McMurdo, as seen by HiRISE.
- Planet: Mars
- Coordinates: 84.4°S 359.1°W
- Quadrangle: Mare Australe
- Eponym: McMurdo Station, Antarctica

McMurdo is a crater in the Mare Australe quadrangle of Mars, located at 84.4° S and 359.1° W. It has a diameter of 30.3 km and is named after McMurdo Station in Antarctica.

== Appearance ==
Many distinct layers are visible in the south wall of the crater. Layering is a widespread feature on Mars and has been documented extensively since the Mars Global Surveyor mission returned high-resolution images of the planet’s surface.

Rock layers on Mars can form through several geological processes, including volcanic activity, wind deposition, or water-related sedimentation.

A comprehensive overview of Martian sedimentary layering is provided in Sedimentary Geology of Mars. Grotzinger and Milliken have discussed how both wind and water likely contributed to the formation of these layers.

Immediately south of McMurdo crater lies a field of short, dark streaks and fans. These features are formed by the seasonal sublimation of carbon dioxide in the spring, when rising temperatures cause pressurized gas to escape through the surface. The escaping CO_{2} gas carries dark material, which is then deposited downwind, forming streaks and fan shapes. Because of their appearance, these features are sometimes referred to as “spiders.”

== Gallery ==
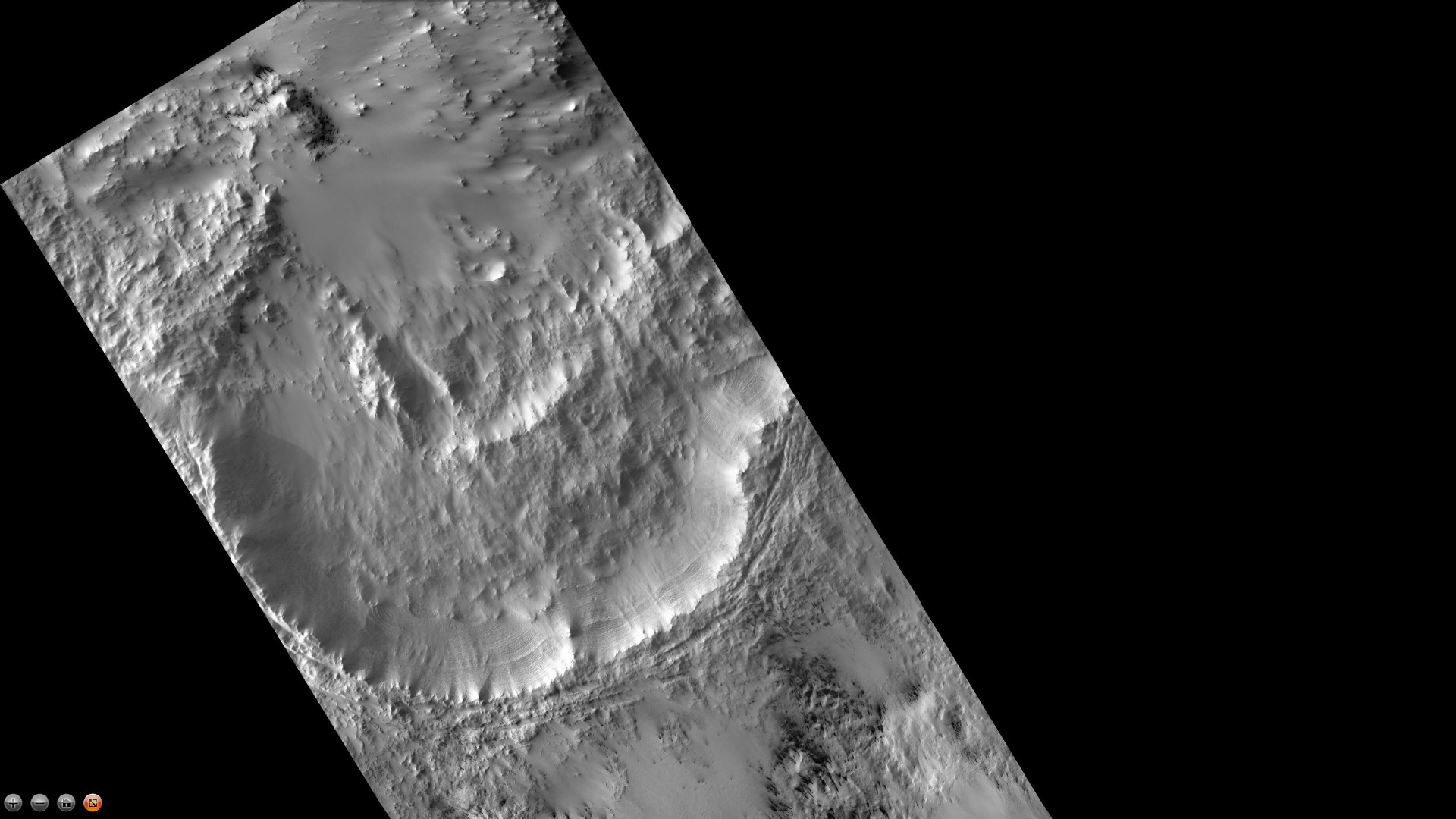
McMurdo crater, as seen by the CTX camera (on Mars Reconnaissance Orbiter).

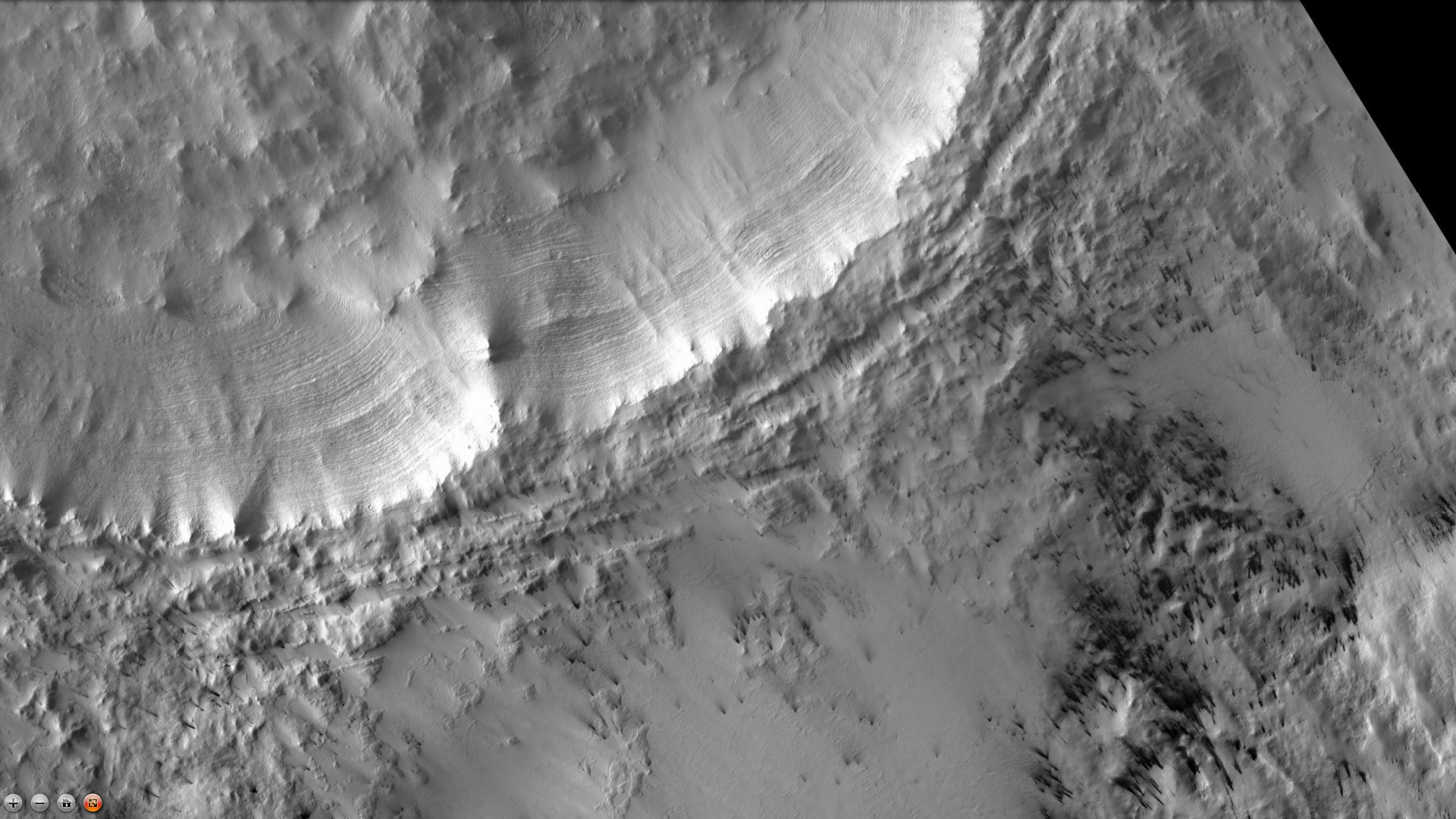
Short dark streaks and fans caused by outgassing of carbon dioxide and dark material. Layers in the crater wall are clearly visible. Image taken with the CTX camera (on Mars Reconnaissance Orbiter).

== See also ==
- Geology of Mars
- Geyser (Mars)
- HiRISE
- Impact crater
- Impact event
- List of craters on Mars
- Ore resources on Mars
- Planetary nomenclature
