= Swiss cheese features =

Enigmatic surface features on Mars's southern ice cap

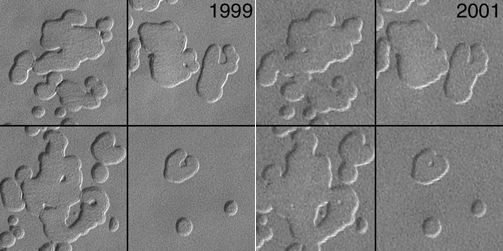
Pits in south polar ice cap, taken in consecutive southern hemisphere summers, the first of which was in 1999, the second in 2001. Mars Global Surveyor, NASA

Swiss cheese features (SCFs) are curious pits in the south polar ice cap of Mars (Mare Australe quadrangle) named from their similarity to the holes in Swiss cheese. They were first seen in 2000 using Mars Orbiter Camera imagery.

== Description ==
They are typically a few hundred meters across and 8 metres deep, with a flat base and steep sides. They tend to have similar bean-like shapes with a cusp pointing towards the south pole, indicating that insolation is involved in their formation. The angle of the Sun probably contributes to their roundness. Near the Martian summer solstice, the Sun can remain continuously just above the horizon; as a result the walls of a round depression will receive more intense sunlight, and sublimate much more rapidly than the floor. The walls sublimate and recede, while the floor remains the same. As the seasonal frost disappears, the pit walls appear to darken considerably relative to the surrounding terrain. The SCFs have been observed to grow in size, year by year, at an average rate of 1 to 3 meters, suggesting that they are formed in a thin layer (8 m) of carbon dioxide ice lying on top of water ice. Later research with HiRISE showed that the pits are in a 1–10-meter-thick layer of dry ice that is sitting on a much larger water ice cap. Pits have been observed to begin with small areas along faint fractures. The circular pits have steep walls that work to focus sunlight, thereby increasing erosion. For a pit to develop, a steep wall of about 10 cm and a length of over 5 meters is necessary.

== Halo features ==
Bright transient halo features around the carbon dioxide pits were found during the southern hemisphere's summer, during Mars year 28 (Earth year 2007). However, this was the only time these features have ever been seen. The data to understand these halos were taken from the MRO (Mars Reconnaissance Orbiter) Context Camera, the HiRISE (High Resolution Imaging Science Experiment) camera, and the MOC (Mars Orbiter Camera). The halo features were only visible during the solar longitudes (position of Mars around the Sun) of 279 degrees and 331 degrees. The halo's appearance correlates to the global dust storm that began earlier in the same Martian year. The lifetime of the halos was broken into trimesters; the first was 285–295 degrees Ls (Solar Longitude, time in the Martian Year), the second was 295–305 degrees Ls, and the final was counted at 305–340 degrees Ls. The average width of the high albedo area around the Swiss cheese features changes throughout its lifetime. In the first trimester the width was calculated to be 12.14 ± 1.44 meters wide, the second trimester was 32.96 ± 4.02 meters wide, and in the final trimester the average width was 55.48 ± 6.98 meters. The Hapke's reflectance theory was used to calculate the brightness of the features. During the first trimester, the halos were 4 ± .3% brighter than the non-halo areas. Then in the second trimester the halos became more prominent at 7 ± .7% brighter. Toward the end of their life they were the brightest recorded at 8 ± .6% brighter than the surrounding topography. The halos are brighter than the surrounding region due to the impurities in the ice. The global dust storm filled the CO_{2} ice with sand and increased the grain size of the ice crystals.

== Gallery ==
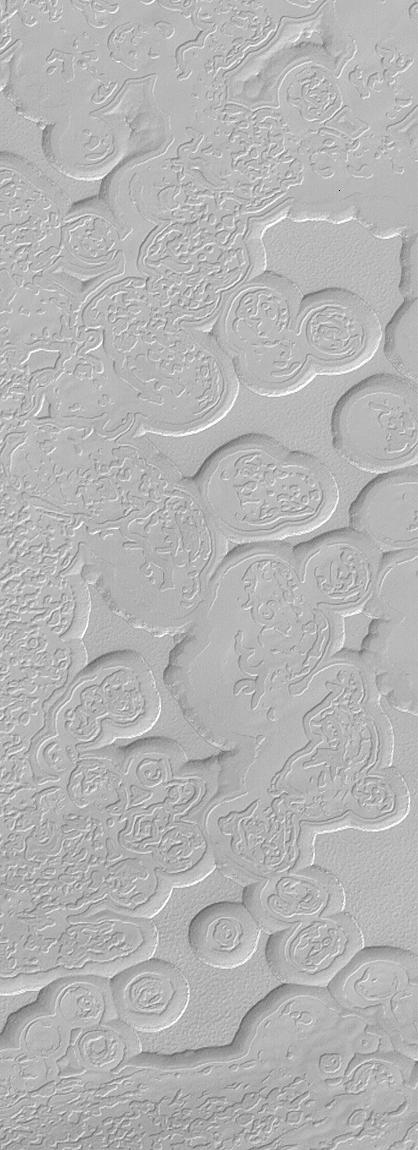
Swiss cheese-like ice formations as seen by Mars Global Surveyor

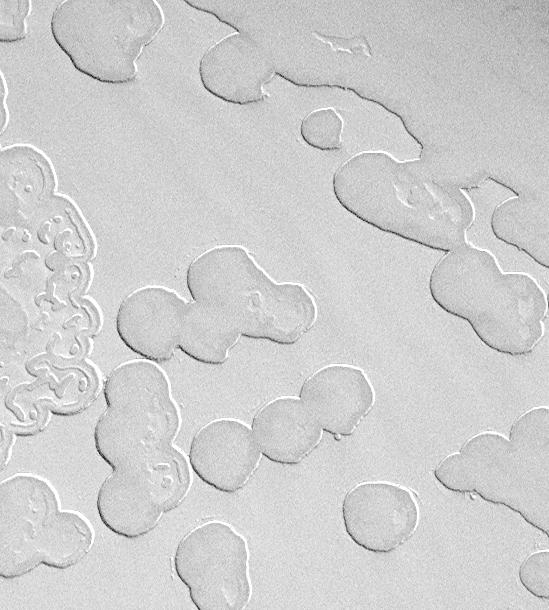
Swiss cheese-like ice formations as seen by Mars Global Surveyor showing layers

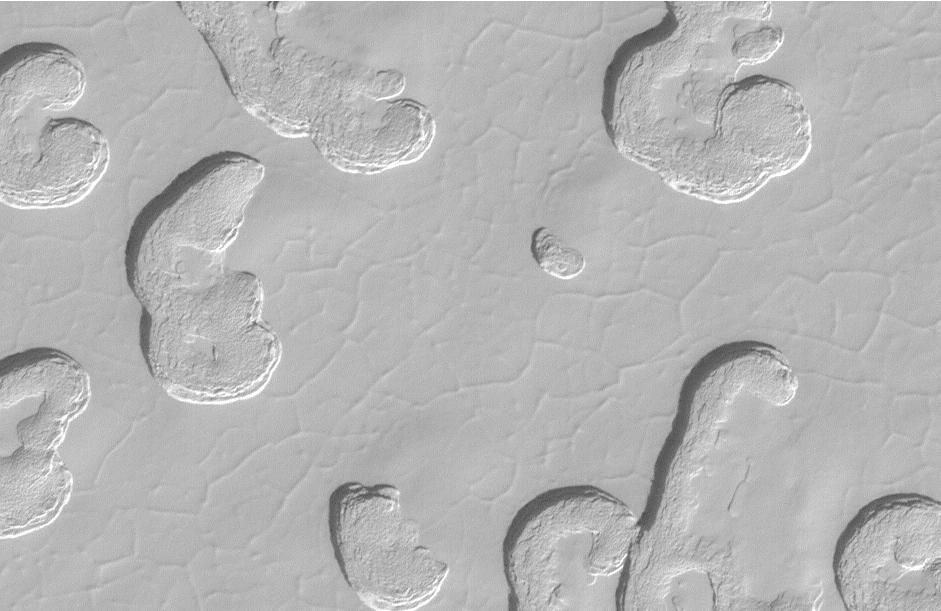
Close-up of Swiss cheese terrain, as seen by Mars Global Surveyor

== See also ==
- Climate of Mars
- Geysers on Mars – Putative CO2 gas and dust eruptions on Mars
- Mare Australe quadrangle – Map of Mars
- Martian polar ice caps – Polar water ice deposits on Mars
