= Angustus Labyrinthus =

Labyrinthus on Mars

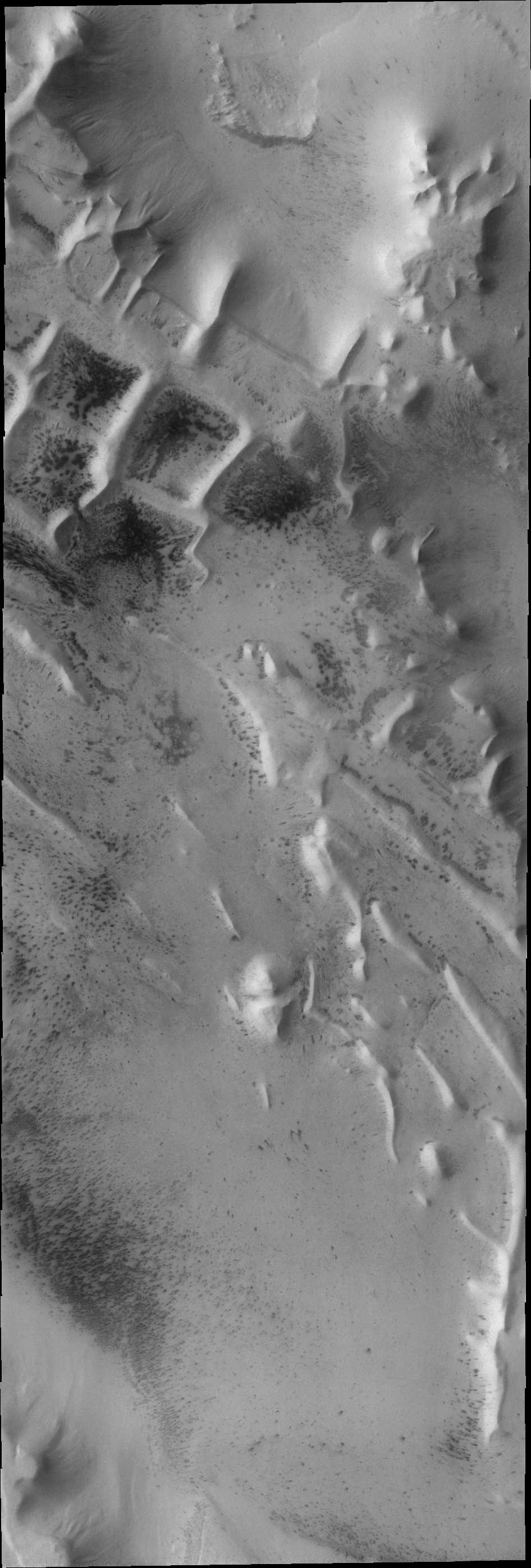
- Angustus Labyrinthus, as seen by THEMIS.
- Coordinates: 81.68°S 63.25°W

Angustus Labyrinthus is a complex of intersecting valleys or ridges near the Martian south pole (in the Mare Australe quadrangle), located at 81.68° S and 63.25° W. It was nicknamed the "Inca City" by NASA scientists due to its superficial resemblance to a ruined city. Like other formations in the area, the name 'Angustus' derives from a name given by Eugene Antoniadi in 1930 to an albedo feature that corresponds with the area. The name was approved in 2006.

Angustus Labyrinthus was discovered by the Mariner 9 probe, which photographed a small area that looked like the ruins of an ancient city. Mariner 9 team members named it the "Inca City". It looked like sand dunes that had formed from winds that blew from two different directions, but the dunes were too big. In 2002 the camera on Mars Global Surveyor revealed that the 'Inca City' was part of a large circular structure that was 86 km in diameter. So the shape meant that it was probably caused by an asteroid impact which cracked the crust. Later, magma flowed along the cracks. When the magma cooled, hard, erosion resistant walls of rock (dikes) formed. The crater was covered over, then partially exhumed. The hard walls of rock were left standing as softer surrounding material eroded away.

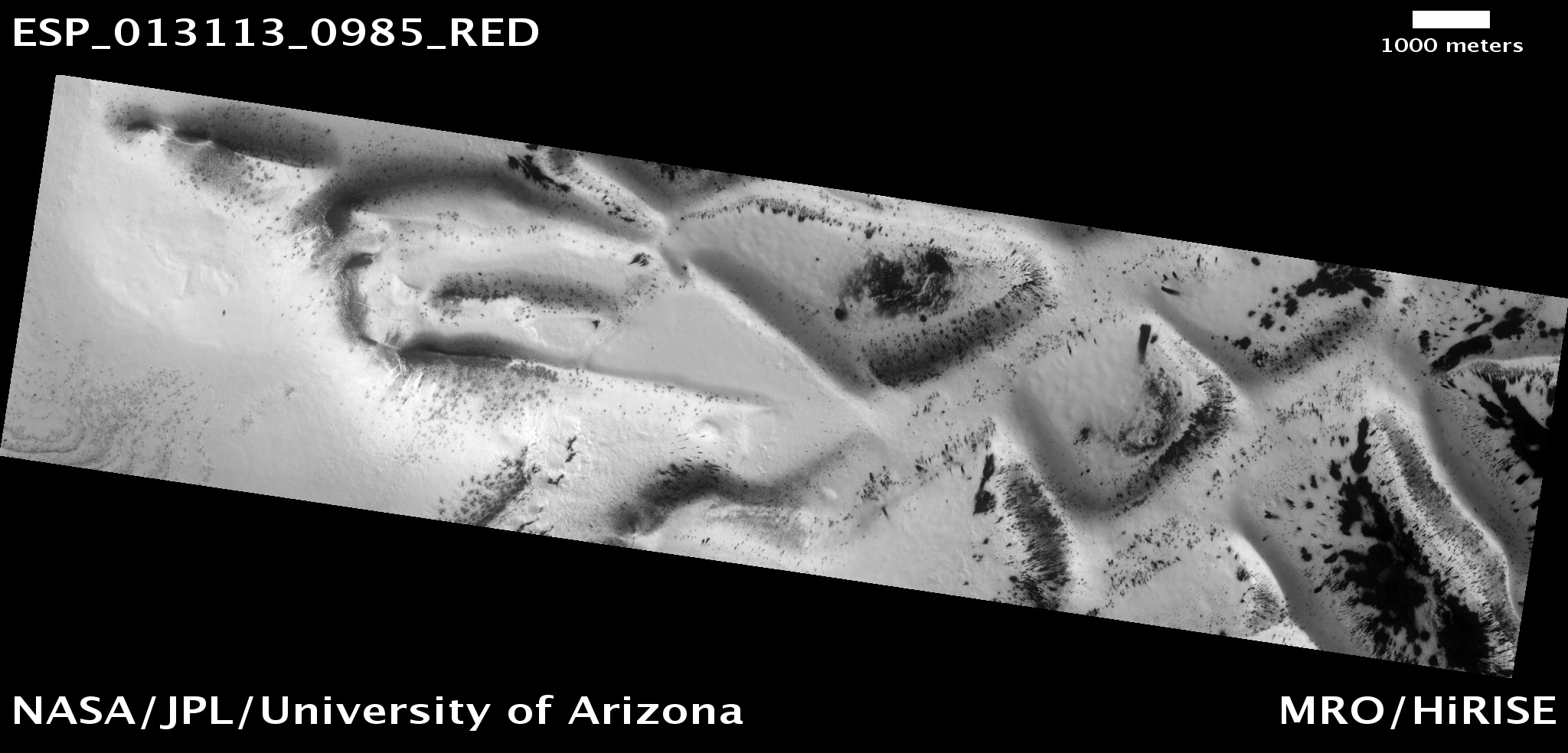
Angustus Labyrinthus as seen by HiRISE. Light patches are frost deposits.
