= Geysers on Mars =

Putative CO2 gas and dust eruptions on Mars

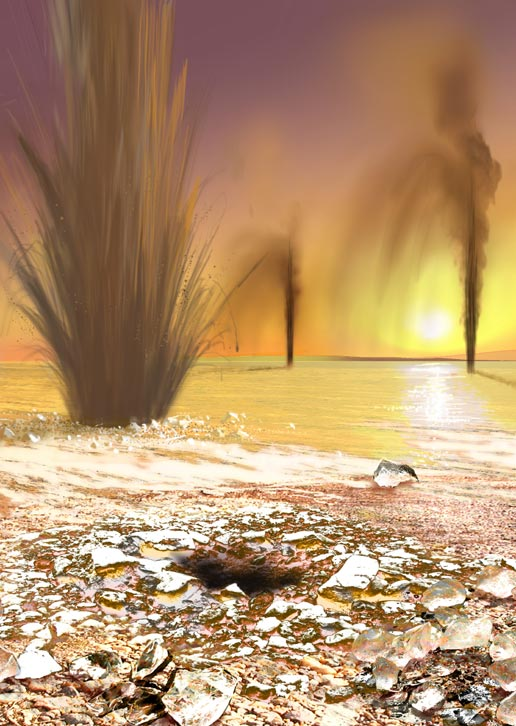
Artist concept showing sand-laden jets erupting from Martian geysers (published by NASA; artist: Ron Miller)

Martian geysers (or CO_{2} jets) are putative sites of small gas and dust eruptions that occur in the south polar region of Mars during the spring thaw. "Dark dune spots" and "spiders" – or araneiforms – are the two most visible types of features ascribed to these eruptions.

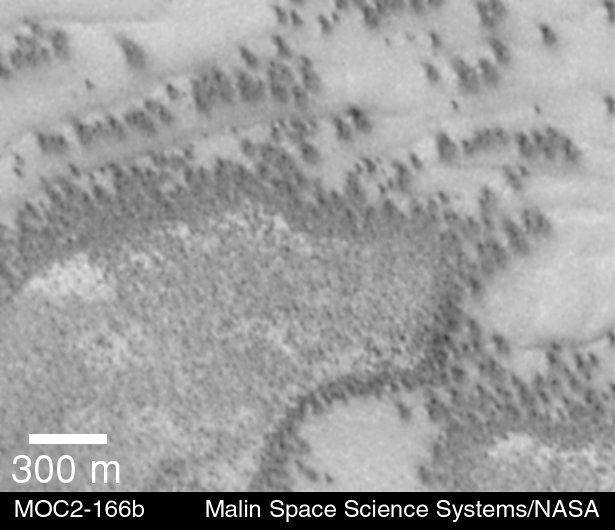
Dark dune spots

Martian geysers are distinct from geysers on Earth, which are typically associated with hydrothermal activity. These are unlike any terrestrial geological phenomenon. The reflectance (albedo), shapes and unusual spider appearance of these features have stimulated a variety of hypotheses about their origin, ranging from differences in frosting reflectance, to explanations involving biological processes. However, all current geophysical models assume some sort of jet or geyser-like activity on Mars. Their characteristics, and the process of their formation, are still a matter of debate.

These features are unique to the south polar region of Mars in an area informally called the 'cryptic region', at latitudes 60° to 80° south and longitudes 150°W to 310°W; this 1 meter deep carbon dioxide (CO_{2}) ice transition area—between the scarps of the thick polar ice layer and the permafrost—is where clusters of the apparent geyser systems are located.

The seasonal frosting and defrosting of carbon dioxide ice results in the appearance of a number of features, such dark dune spots with spider-like rilles or channels below the ice, where spider-like radial channels are carved between the ground and the carbon dioxide ice, giving it an appearance of spider webs, then, pressure accumulating in their interior ejects gas and dark basaltic sand or dust, which is deposited on the ice surface and thus, forming dark dune spots. This process is rapid, observed happening in the space of a few days, weeks or months, a growth rate rather unusual in geology – especially for Mars. However, it would seem that multiple years would be required to carve the larger spider-like channels. There is no direct data on these features other than images taken in the visible and infrared spectra.

== History ==
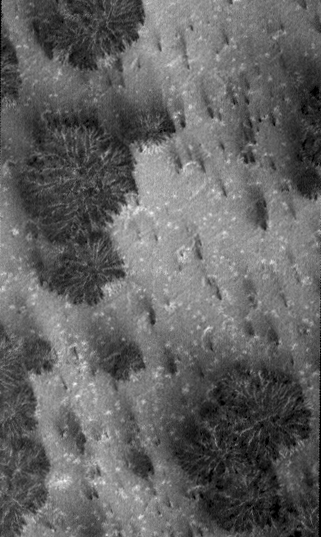
Close up of dark dune spots obtained by the Mars Global Surveyor and discovered in 2000 by Greg Orme

The geological features informally called dark dune spots and spiders were separately discovered on images acquired by the MOC camera on board the Mars Global Surveyor during 1998–1999. At first it was generally thought they were unrelated features because of their appearance, so from 1998 through 2000 they were reported separately on different research publications ( and -respectively). "Jet" or "geyser" models were proposed and refined from 2000 onwards.

The name 'spiders' was coined by Malin Space Science Systems personnel, the developers of the camera. One of the first and most interesting spider photos was found by Greg Orme in October 2000. The unusual shape and appearance of these 'spider webs' and spots caused a lot of speculation about their origin. The first years' surveillance showed that during the following Martian years, 70% of the spots appear at exactly the same place, and a preliminary statistical study obtained between September 1999 and March 2005, indicated that dark dune spots and spiders are related phenomena as functions of the cycle of carbon dioxide (CO_{2}) condensing as "dry ice" and sublimating.

It was also initially suggested that the dark spots were simply warm patches of bare ground, but thermal imaging during 2006 revealed that these structures were as cold as the ice that covers the area, indicating they were a thin layer of dark material lying on top of the ice and kept chilled by it. However, soon after their first detection, they were discovered to be negative topographical features – i.e. radial troughs or channels of what today are thought to be geyser-like vent systems.

== Morphology ==
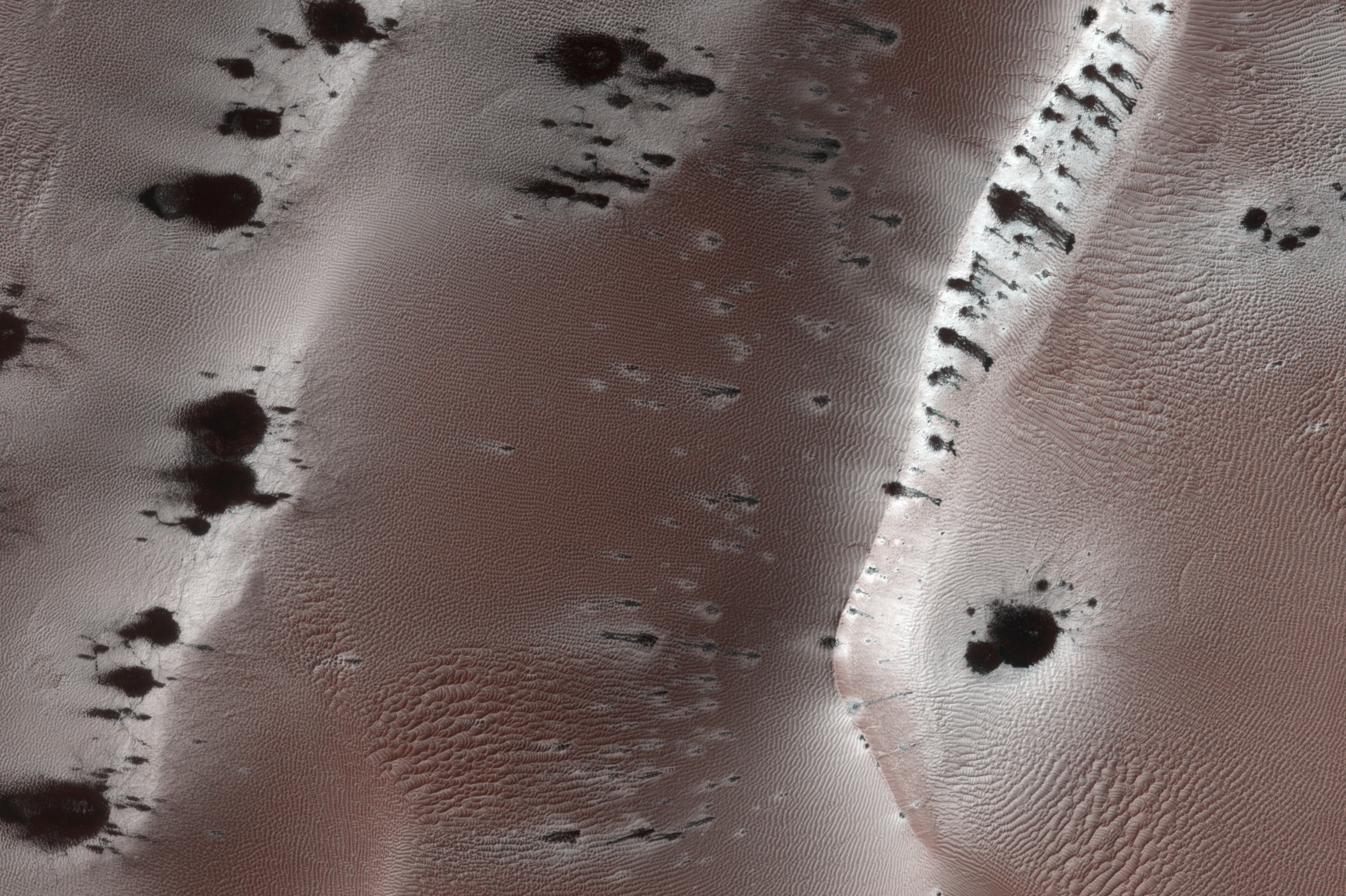
Dark dune spots. High resolution color image by the HiRISE camera

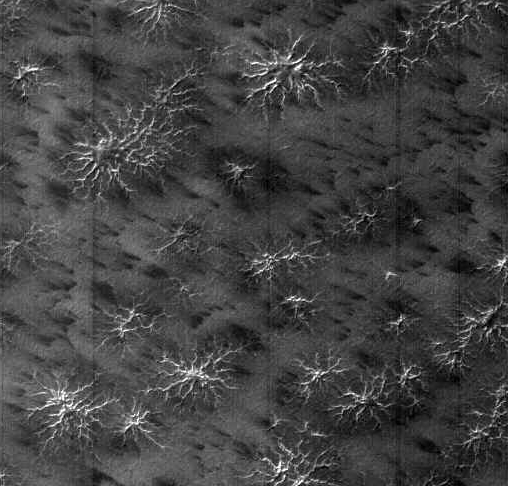
'Spider' features shown in relationship to dark dune spots

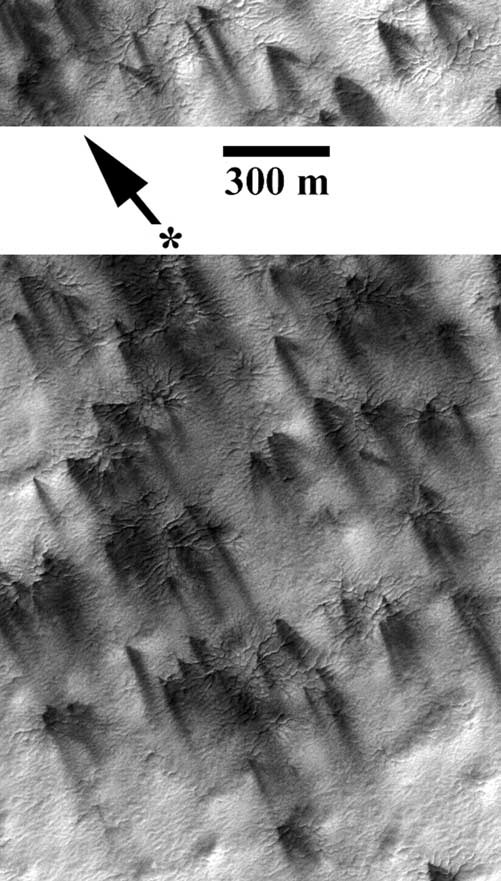
Dark sediment spots apparently emanating from 'spider' formations

The geysers' two most prominent features (dark dune spots and spider channels) appear at the beginning of the Martian spring on dune fields covered with carbon dioxide (CO_{2} or 'dry ice'), mainly at the ridges and slopes of the dunes; by the beginning of winter, they disappear. Dark spots' shape is generally round, on the slopes it is usually elongated, sometimes with streams—possibly of water—that accumulate in pools at the bottom of the dunes. Dark dune spots are typically 15 to 46 metres (50 to 150 feet) wide and spaced several hundred feet apart. The size of spots varies, and some are as small as 20 m across,—however, the smaller size seen is limited by imaging resolution—and can grow and coalesce into formations several kilometres wide.

Spider features, when viewed individually, form a round lobed structure reminiscent of a spider web radiating outward in lobes from a central point. Its radial patterns represent shallow channels or ducts in the ice formed by the flow of the sublimation gas toward the vents. The entire spider channel network is typically 160–300 m across, although there are large variations.

Each geyser's characteristic form appears to depend on a combination of such factors as local fluid or gas composition and pressure, ice thickness, underlying gravel type, local climate and meteorological conditions. The geysers' boundary does not seem to correlate with any other properties of the surface such as elevation, geological structure, slope, chemical composition or thermal properties. The geyser-like system produce low-albedo spots, fans and blotches, with small radial spider-like channel networks most often associated with their location. At first, the spots seem to be grey, but later their centres darken because they gradually get covered with dark ejecta, thought to be mainly basaltic sand. Not all dark spots observed in early spring are associated with spider landforms, however, a preponderance of dark spots and streaks on the cryptic terrain are associated with the appearance of spiders later in the season.

Time-lapsed imagery performed by NASA confirms the apparent ejection of dark material following the radial growth of spider channels in the ice. Time-lapsed imaging of a single area of interest also shows that small dark spots generally indicate the position of spider features not yet visible; it also shows that spots expand significantly, including dark fans emanating from some of the spots, which increase in prominence and develop clear directionality indicative of wind action.

Some branching ravines modify, some destroy and others create crust in a dynamic near-surface process that extensively reworks the terrain creating and destroying surface layers. Thus, Mars seems to have a dynamic process of recycling of its near surface crust of carbon dioxide. Growth process is rapid, happening in the space of a few days, weeks or months, a growth rate rather unusual in geology – especially for Mars. A number of geophysical models have been investigated to explain the various colors and shapes' development of these geysers on the southern polar ice cap of Mars.

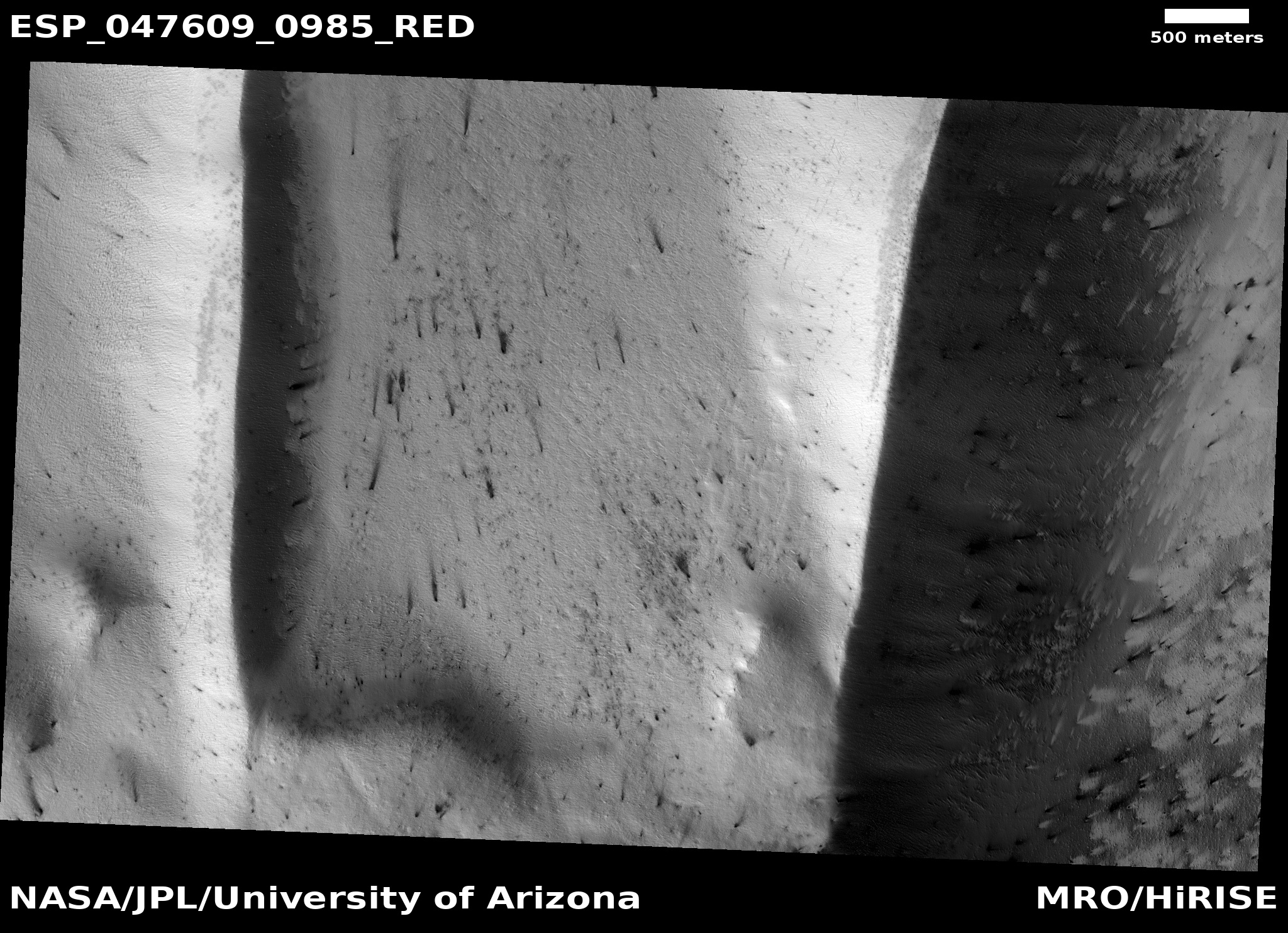
Wide view of plumes, as seen by HiRISE under HiWish program. Many of the plumes show spiders when enlarged.

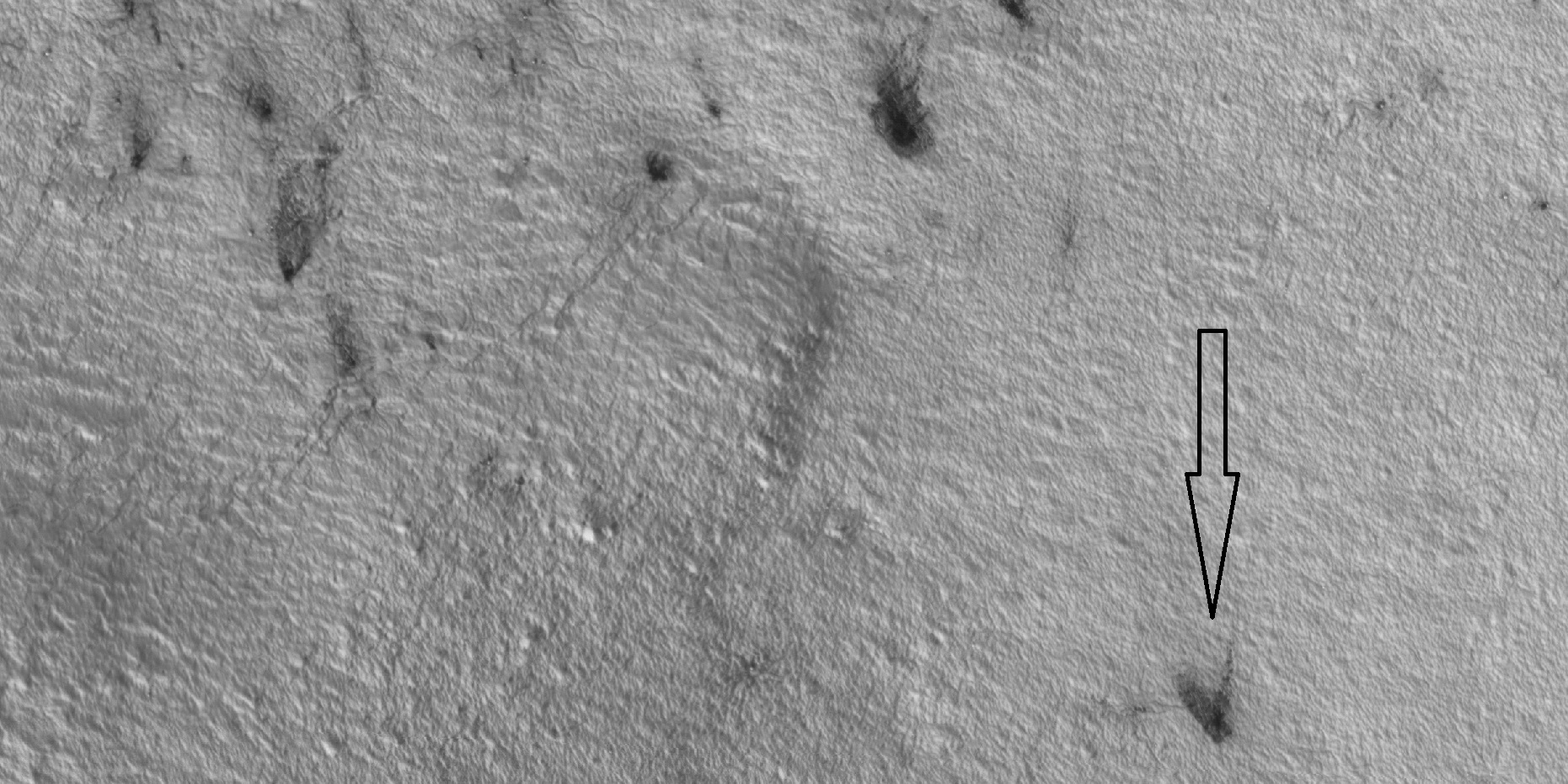
Plumes, as seen by HiRISE under HiWish program Arrow shows a double plume. This may have been because of shifting winds.

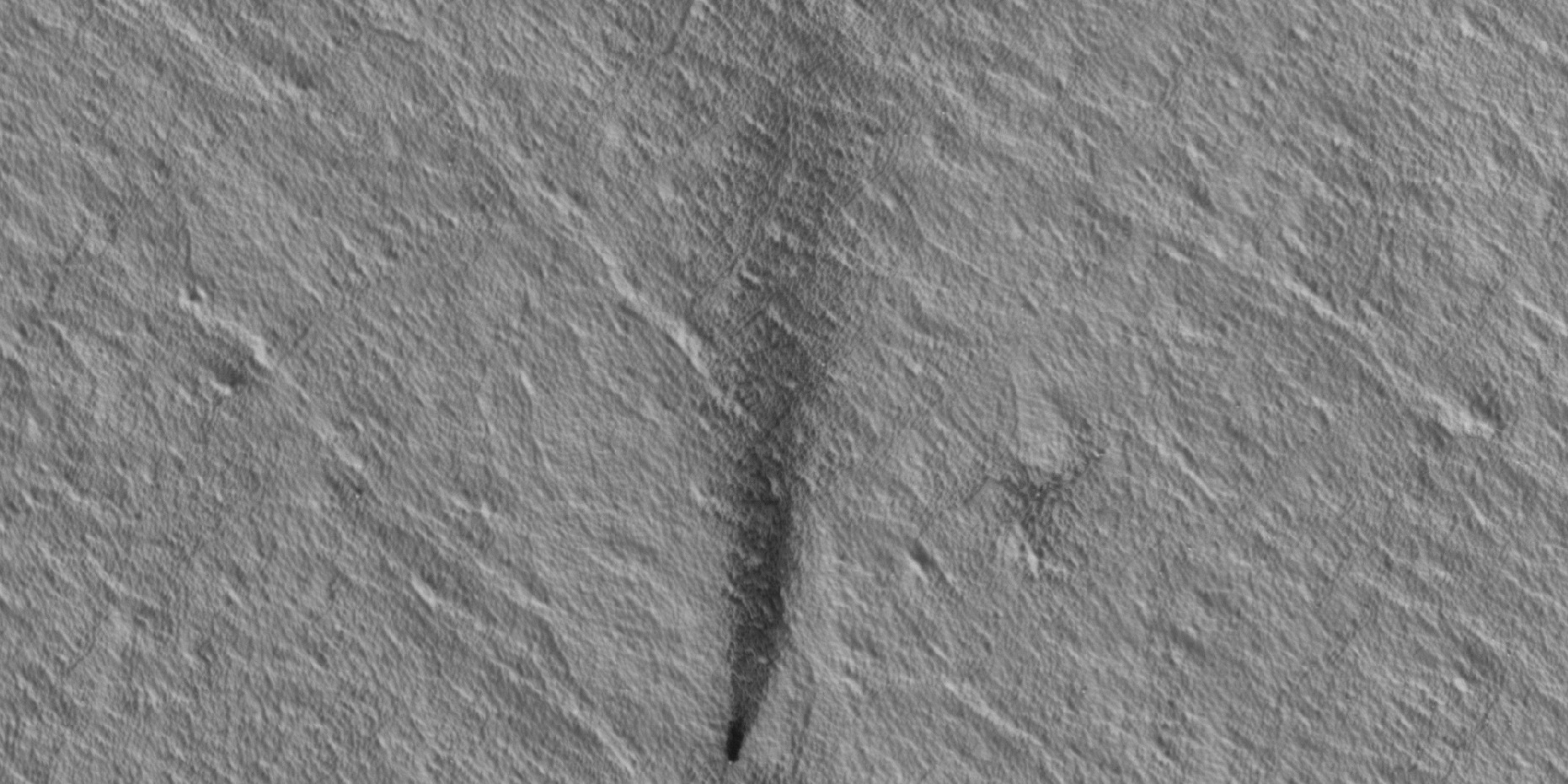
Long plume, as seen by HiRISE under HiWish program

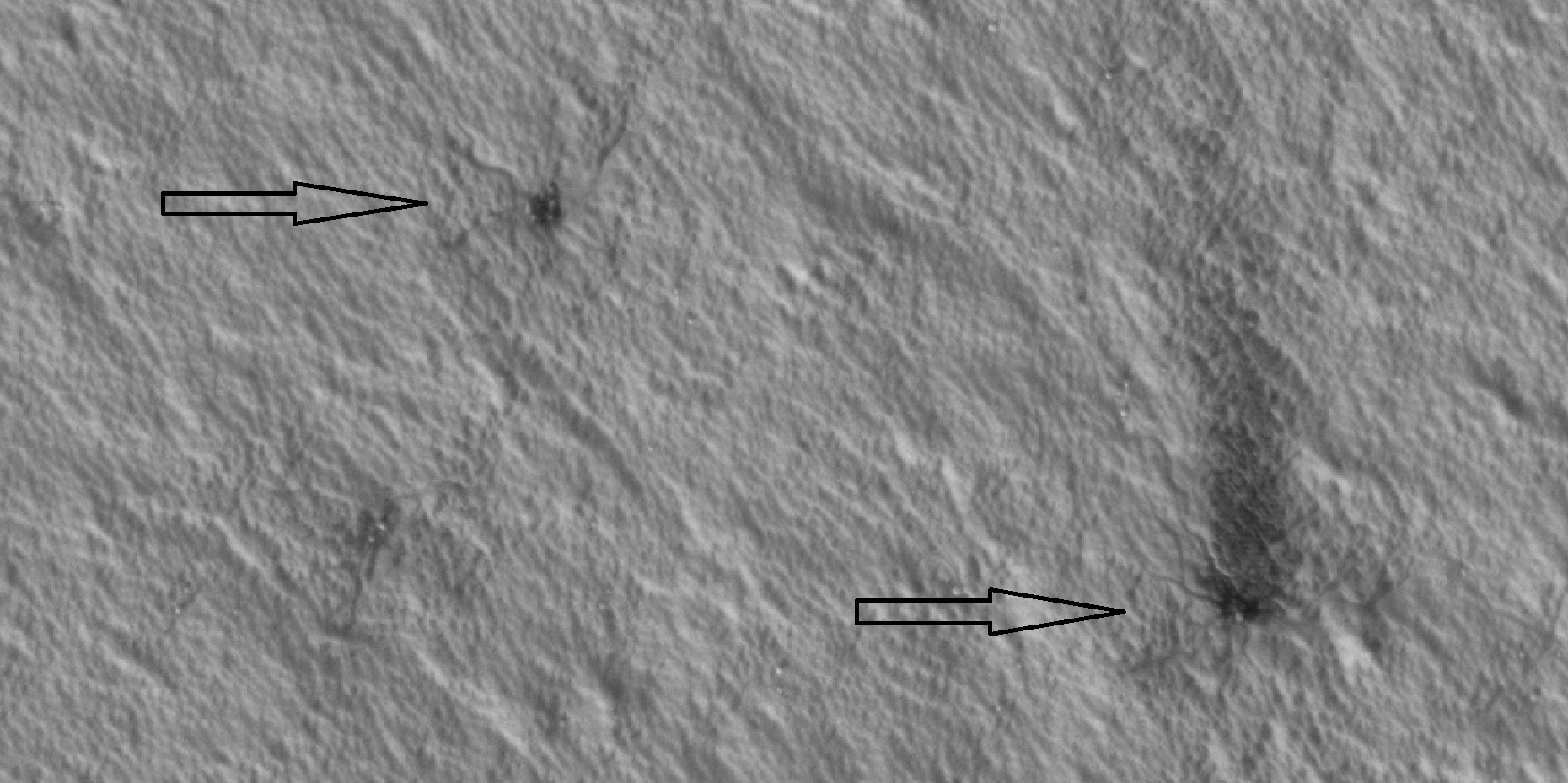
Spiders, as seen by HiRISE under HiWish program

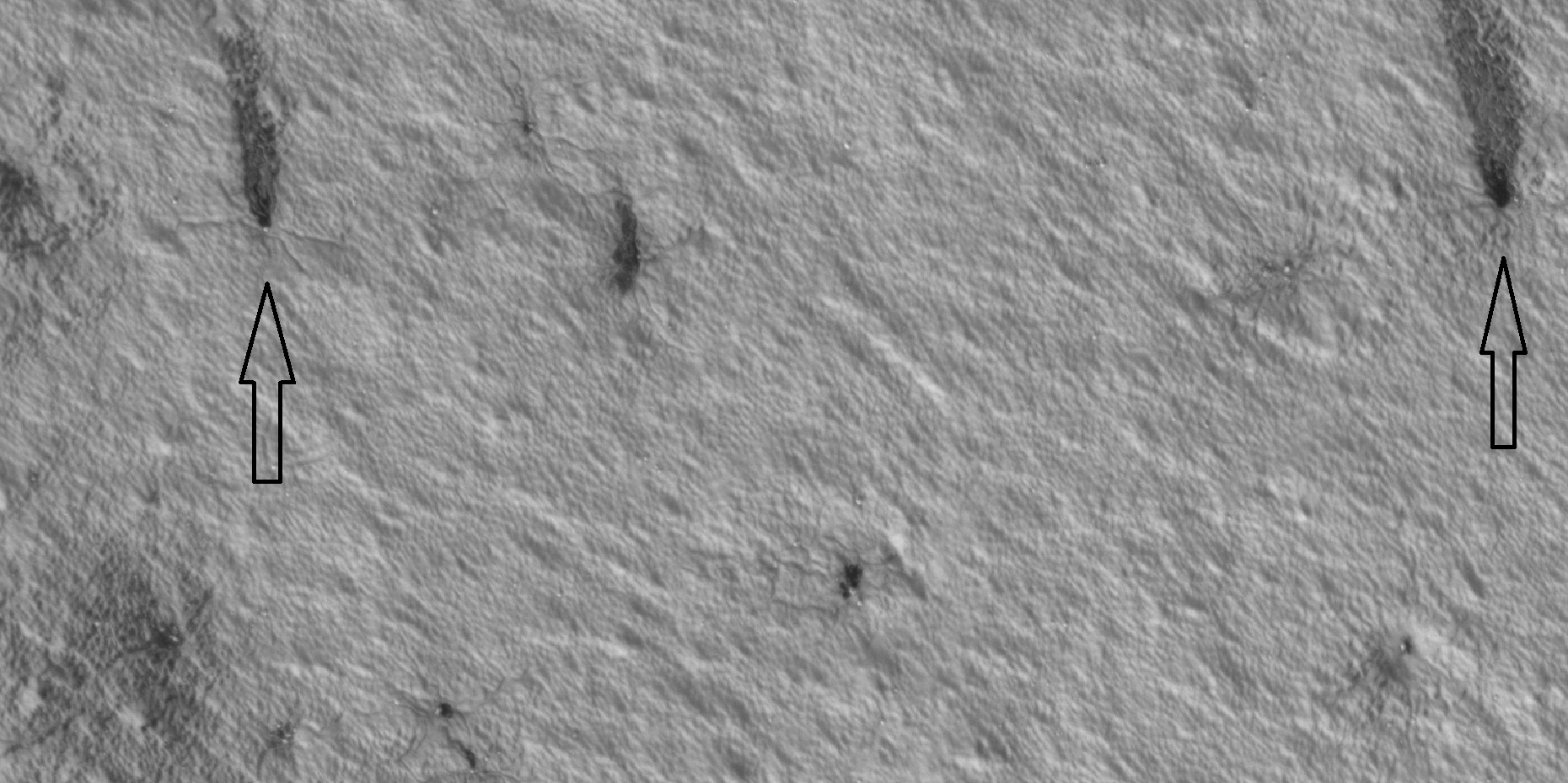
Plumes and spiders, as seen by HiRISE under HiWish program

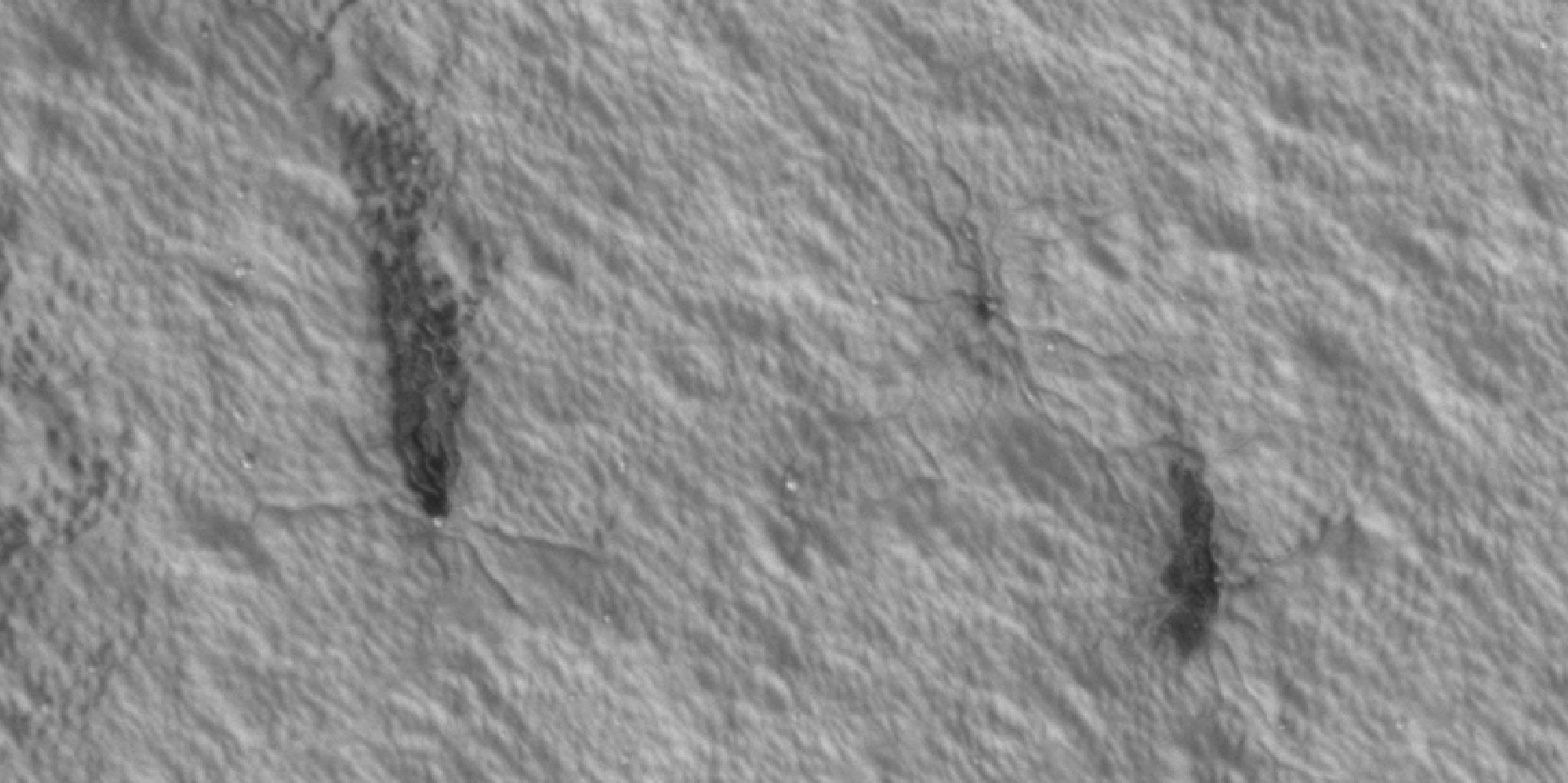
Plumes and spiders, as seen by HiRISE under HiWish program

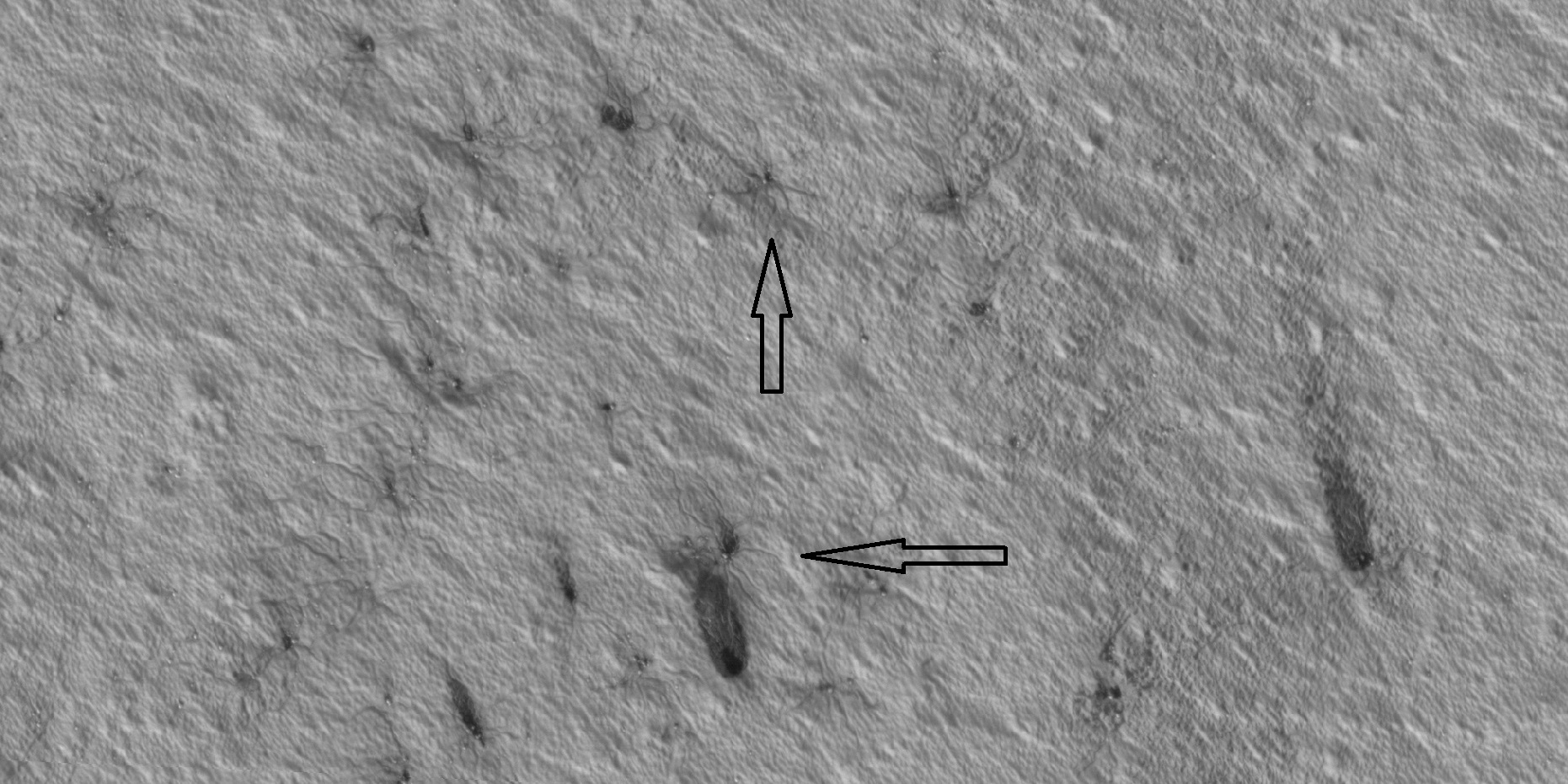
Plumes and spiders, as seen by HiRISE under HiWish program

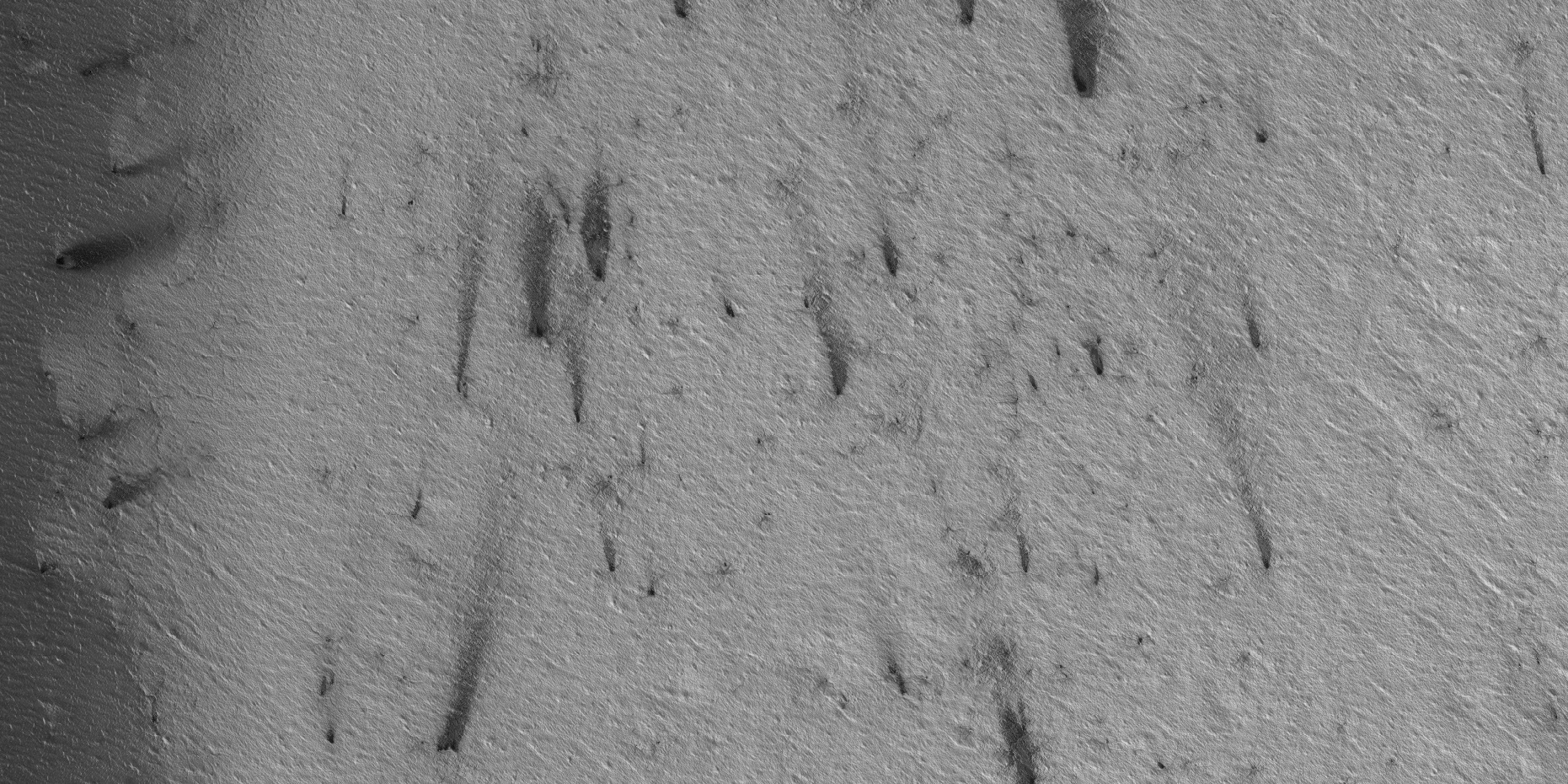
Wide view of plumes and spiders, as seen by HiRISE under HiWish program

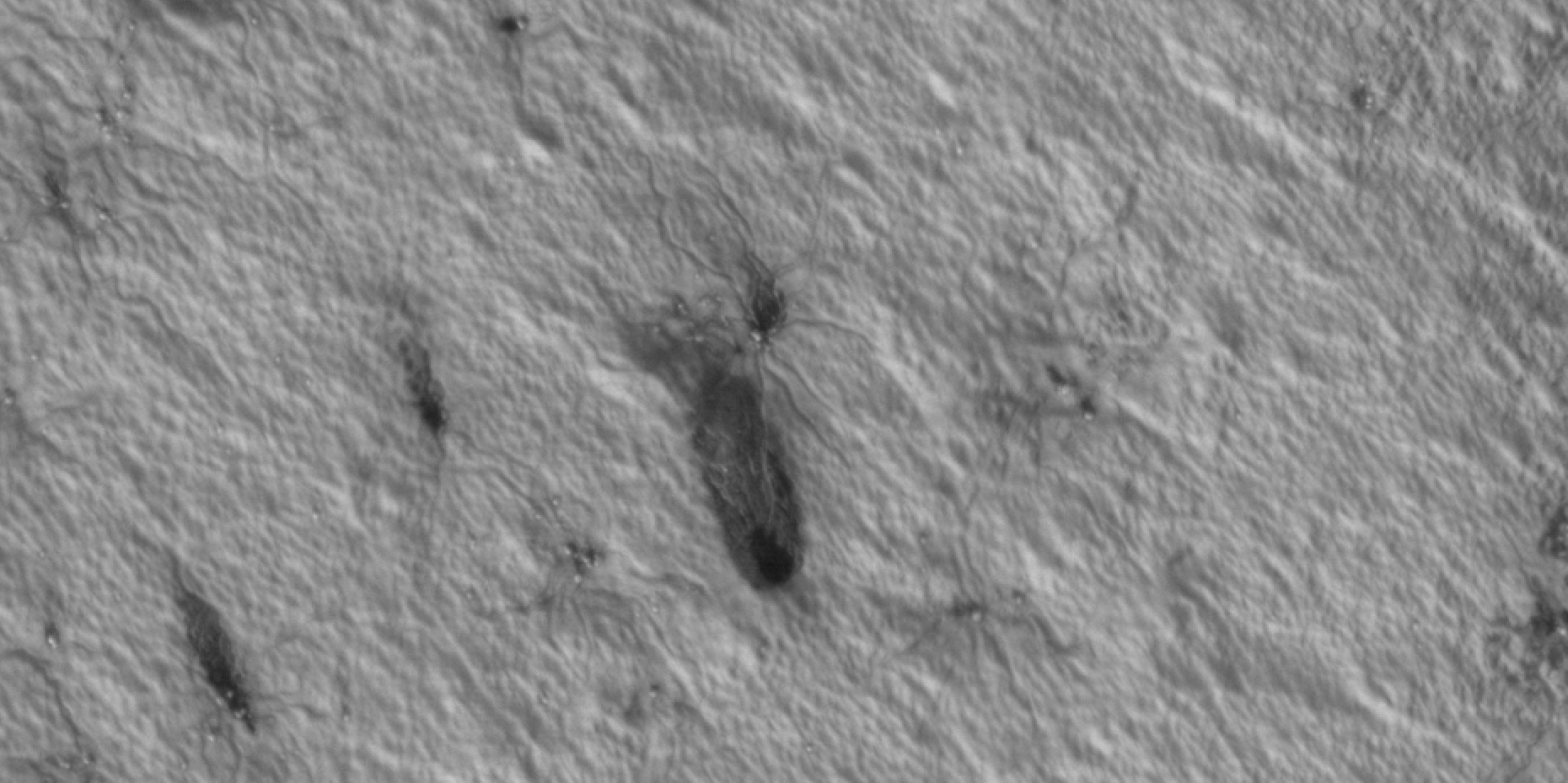
Plumes and spiders, as seen by HiRISE under HiWish program

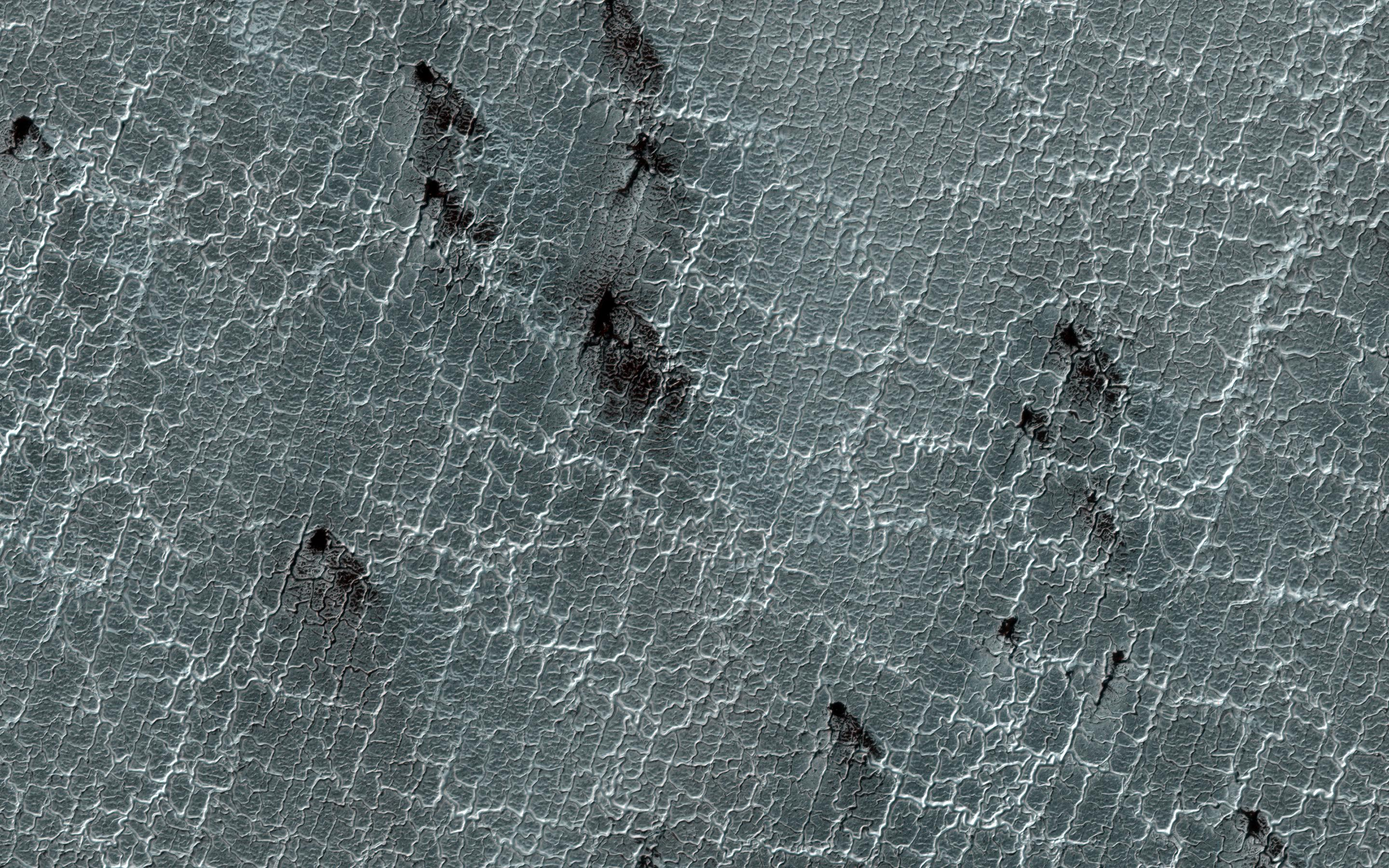
Spiderlike terrain on Mars

== Geyser mechanism models ==
The strength of the eruptions is estimated to range from simple upsurges to high-pressure eruptions at speeds of 160 kilometres per hour (99 mph) or more, carrying dark basaltic sand and dust plumes high aloft. The current proposed models dealing with the possible forces powering the geyser-like system are discussed next.

=== Atmospheric pressure ===
The surface atmospheric pressure on Mars varies annually around: 6.7–8.8 mbar and 7.5–9.7 mbar; daily around 6.4–6.8 mbar. Because of the pressure changes subsurface gases expand and contract periodically, causing a downward gas flow during increase of and expulsion during decrease of atmospheric pressure. This cycle was first quantified with measurements of the surface pressure, which varies annually with amplitude of 25%.

Clathrate hydrate model

This model proposes downward gas flow during increase of and upward flow during decrease of atmospheric pressure. In the defrosting process, ices (clathrate) may partly migrate into the soil and partly may evaporate. These locations can be in connection with the formation of dark dune spots and the arms of spiders as gas travel paths.

=== Dry venting ===
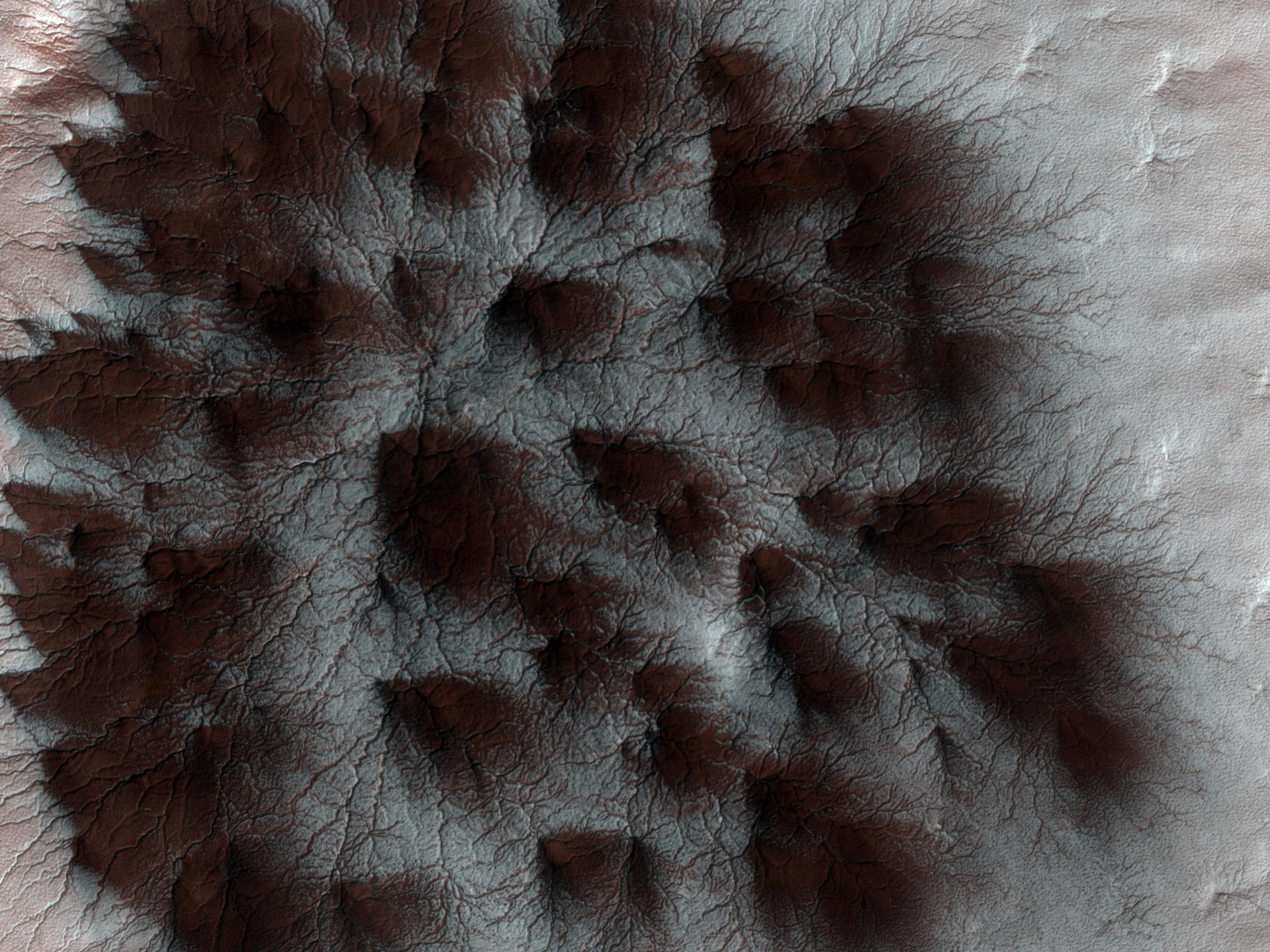
A large 'spider' feature apparently emanating sediment to give rise to dark dune spots. Image size: 1 km (0.62 mi) across.

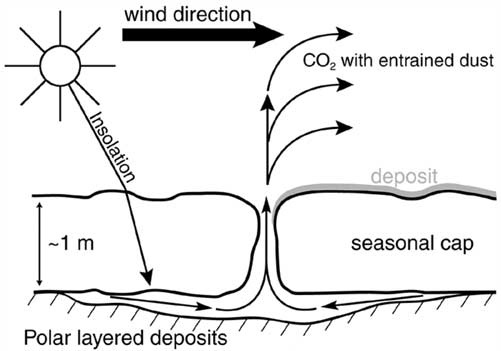
According to Sylvain Piqueux, sun light causes sublimation from the bottom, leading to a buildup of pressurized CO_{2} gas which eventually bursts out, entraining dust and leading to dark fan-shaped deposits with clear directionality indicative of wind action.

Some teams propose dry venting of carbon dioxide (CO_{2}) gas and sand, occurring between the ice and the underlying bedrock. It is known that a CO_{2} ice slab is virtually transparent to solar radiation where 72% of solar energy incident at 60 degrees off vertical will reach the bottom of a 1 m thick layer. In addition, separate teams from Taiwan and France measured the ice thickness in several target areas, and discovered that the greatest thickness of the CO_{2} frost layer in the geysers' area is about 0.76–0.78 m, supporting the geophysical model of dry venting powered by sunlight. As the southern spring CO_{2} ice receives enough solar energy, it starts sublimation of the CO_{2} ice from the bottom. This vapor accumulates under the slab rapidly increasing pressure and erupting. High-pressure gas flows through at speeds of 160 kilometres per hour (99 mph) or more; under the slab, the gas erodes ground as it rushes toward the vents, snatching up loose particles of sand and carving the spidery network of grooves. The dark material falls back to the surface and may be taken up slope by wind, creating dark wind streak patterns on the ice cap. This model is consistent with past observations. The location, size and direction of these fans are useful to quantifying seasonal winds and sublimation activity.

It is clear that sublimation of the base of the seasonal ice cap is more than capable of generating a substantial overpressure, which is four orders of magnitude higher than the ice overburden pressure and five orders of magnitude higher than atmospheric pressure as discussed above.

The observation that a few dark spots form before sunrise, with significant spot formation occurring immediately following sunrise, supports the notion that the system is powered by solar energy. Eventually the ice is completely removed and the dark granular material is back on the surface; the cycle repeats many times.

Laboratory experiments performed in 2016 were able to trigger dust eruptions from a layer of dust inside a CO_{2} ice slab under Martian atmospheric conditions, lending support to the CO_{2} jet and fan production model.

=== Water-driven erosion ===
Data obtained by the Mars Express satellite made it possible in 2004 to confirm that the southern polar ice cap, like the in north, is primarily composed of layered water ice deposits, reaching 3.7 kilometers (2.3 miles) in depth. The new data allowed planetary scientists to split the south pole region into 3 parts: the bright polar cap itself is a mixture of 85% CO_{2} ice and 15% water ice. The second part comprises steep slopes known as 'scarps', made almost entirely of water ice, that fall away from the polar cap to the surrounding plains. The third component, extending hundreds of kilometers beyond the scarps, consists of permanently frozen permafrost locked in Martian soils. The transition zone between the scarps and the permafrost is the 'cryptic region', where clusters of geysers are located.

This model explores the possibility of active water-driven erosive structures, where soil and water derived from the shallow sub-surface layer is expelled up by CO_{2} gas through fissures eroding joints to create spider-like radiating tributaries capped with mud-like material and/or ice.

=== Geothermal ===
A European team proposes that the features could be a sign that non-solar energy source is responsible of the jets, subsurface heat wave for instance. This model is difficult to reconcile with the evidence collected in the form of thermal emission (infrared) imaging, which shows that the fans, spots and blotches are produced by expulsion of cold fluids or cold gases.

=== Carbon dioxide and water cycling ===
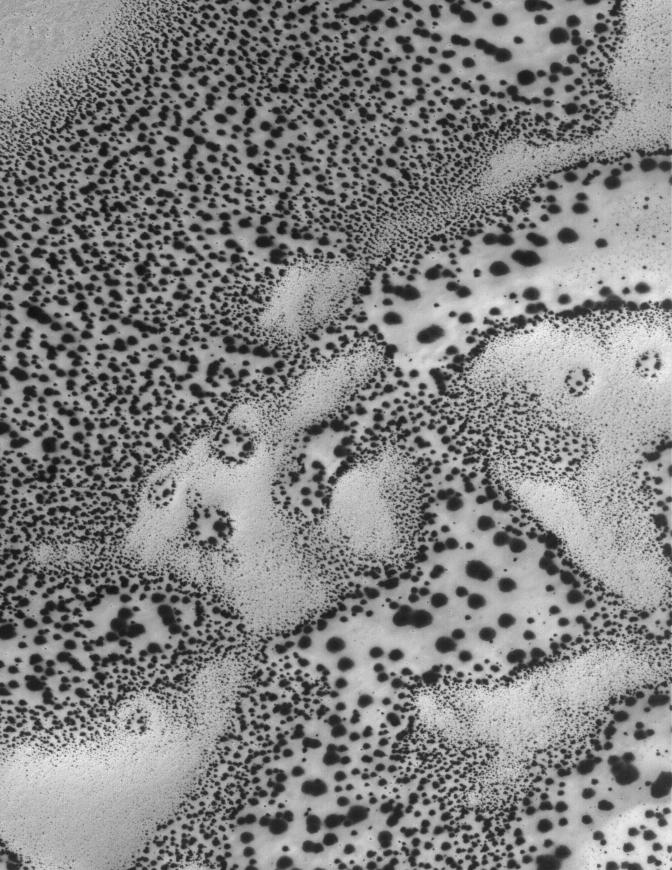
Dark dune spots

Michael C. Malin, a planetary scientist and designer of the cameras used by the Mars Global Surveyor that obtained the earliest images of the CO_{2} geyser phenomenon, is studying the images acquired of specific areas and he tracks their changes over a period of a few years. In 2000, he modelled the fans and spots' dynamics as a complex process of carbon dioxide (CO_{2}) and water sublimation and re-precipitation. The typical pattern of defrosting proceeds from the initiation of small, dark spots typically located at the margins of dunes; these spots individually enlarge and eventually all coalesce. The pattern the enlargement follows is distinct and characteristic: a dark nuclear spot enlarges slowly, often with a bright outer zone or 'halo'. As these are progressive, centripetal phenomena, each location of the light zone is overtaken by an expanding dark zone. Although initially developed along dune margins, spot formation quickly spreads onto and between dunes. As spring progresses, fan-shaped tails ('spiders') develop from the central spot. Defrosting occurs as the low albedo polar sand heats beneath an optically thin layer of frost, causing the frost to evaporate. This is the dark nucleus of the spots seen on dunes. As the vapor moves laterally, it encounters cold air and precipitates, forming the bright halo. This precipitated frost is again vaporized as the uncovered zone of sand expands; the cycle repeats many times.

== European Space Agency ==
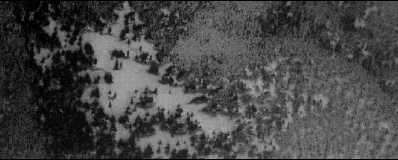
Dark dune spots

While the European Space Agency (ESA) has not yet formulated a theory or model, they have stated that the process of frost sublimation is not compatible with a few important features observed in the images, and that the location and shape of the spots is at odds with a physical explanation, specifically, because the channels appear to radiate downhill as much as they radiate uphill, defying gravity.

== Hypothetical biological origin ==
A team of Hungarian scientists propose that the dark dune spots and channels may be colonies of photosynthetic Martian microorganisms, which over-winter beneath the ice cap, and as the sunlight returns to the pole during early spring, light penetrates the ice, the microorganisms photosynthesise and heat their immediate surroundings. A pocket of liquid water, which would normally evaporate instantly in the thin Martian atmosphere, is trapped around them by the overlying ice. As this ice layer thins, the microorganisms show through grey. When it has completely melted, they rapidly desiccate and turn black surrounded by a grey aureole. The Hungarian scientists think that even a complex sublimation process is insufficient to explain the formation and evolution of the dark dune spots in space and time. Since their discovery, fiction writer Arthur C. Clarke promoted these formations as deserving of study from an astrobiological perspective.

A multinational European team suggests that if liquid water is present in the spiders' channels during their annual defrost cycle, the structures might provide a niche where certain microscopic life forms could have retreated and adapted while sheltered from UV solar radiation. British and German teams also consider the possibility that organic matter, microbes, or even simple plants might co-exist with these inorganic formations, especially if the mechanism includes liquid water and a geothermal energy source. However, they also remark that the majority of geological structures may be accounted for without invoking any organic "life on Mars" hypothesis. (See also: Life on Mars.)

== Lander mission ==
There is no direct data on these features other than images taken in the visible and infrared spectra, and development of the Mars Geyser Hopper lander is under consideration to study the geyser-like systems. It has not yet been formally proposed nor funded.

== See also ==
- Arachnoid (astrogeology) – Large structure of unknown origin on Venus
- Chaos terrain – Distinctive area of broken or jumbled terrain
- Geology of Mars – Geology of fourth planet from the Sun
- Planetary geology – Geological study of planets
- Rille – Fissure, especially on the Moon
- Swiss cheese features – Enigmatic surface features on Mars's southern ice cap
