= MARSIS =

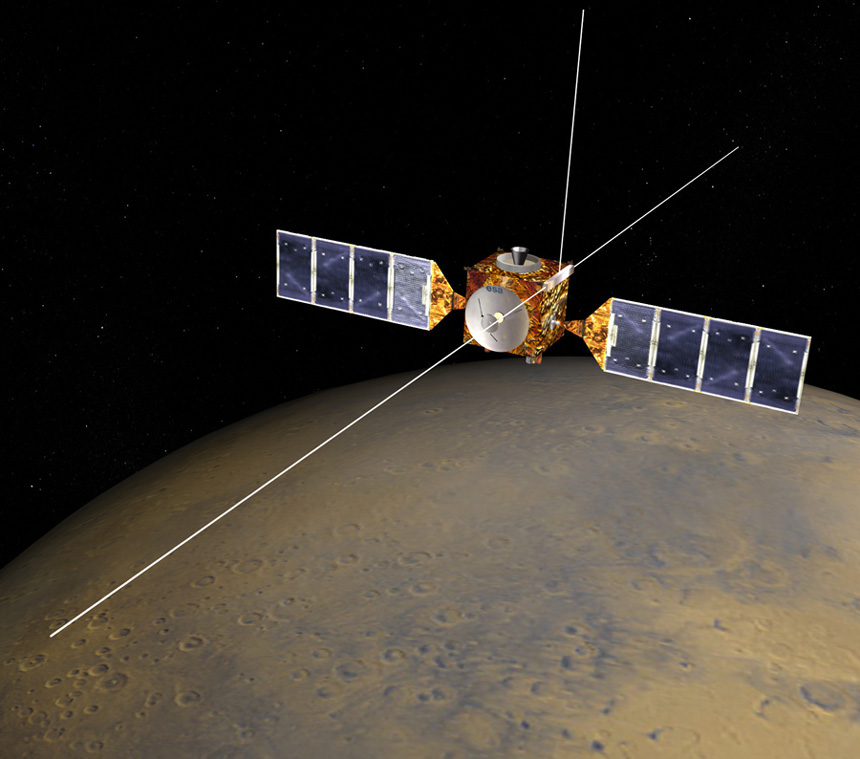
Illustration of Mars Express with MARSIS antenna deployed

MARSIS (Mars Advanced Radar for Subsurface and Ionosphere Sounding) is a low frequency, pulse-limited radar sounder and altimeter developed by the University of Rome La Sapienza and Alenia Spazio (today Thales Alenia Space Italy). The Italian MARSIS instrument, which is operated by the European Space Agency, is operational and orbits Mars as an instrument for the ESA's Mars Express exploration mission.

The MARSIS Principal Investigator is Giovanni Picardi from the University of Rome "La Sapienza", Italy. It features ground-penetrating radar capabilities, which uses synthetic aperture technique and a secondary receiving antenna to isolate subsurface reflections. MARSIS identified buried basins on Mars. MARSIS was funded by ASI (Italy) and NASA (USA). The processor runs the real-time operating system EONIC Virtuoso.

== Deployment ==
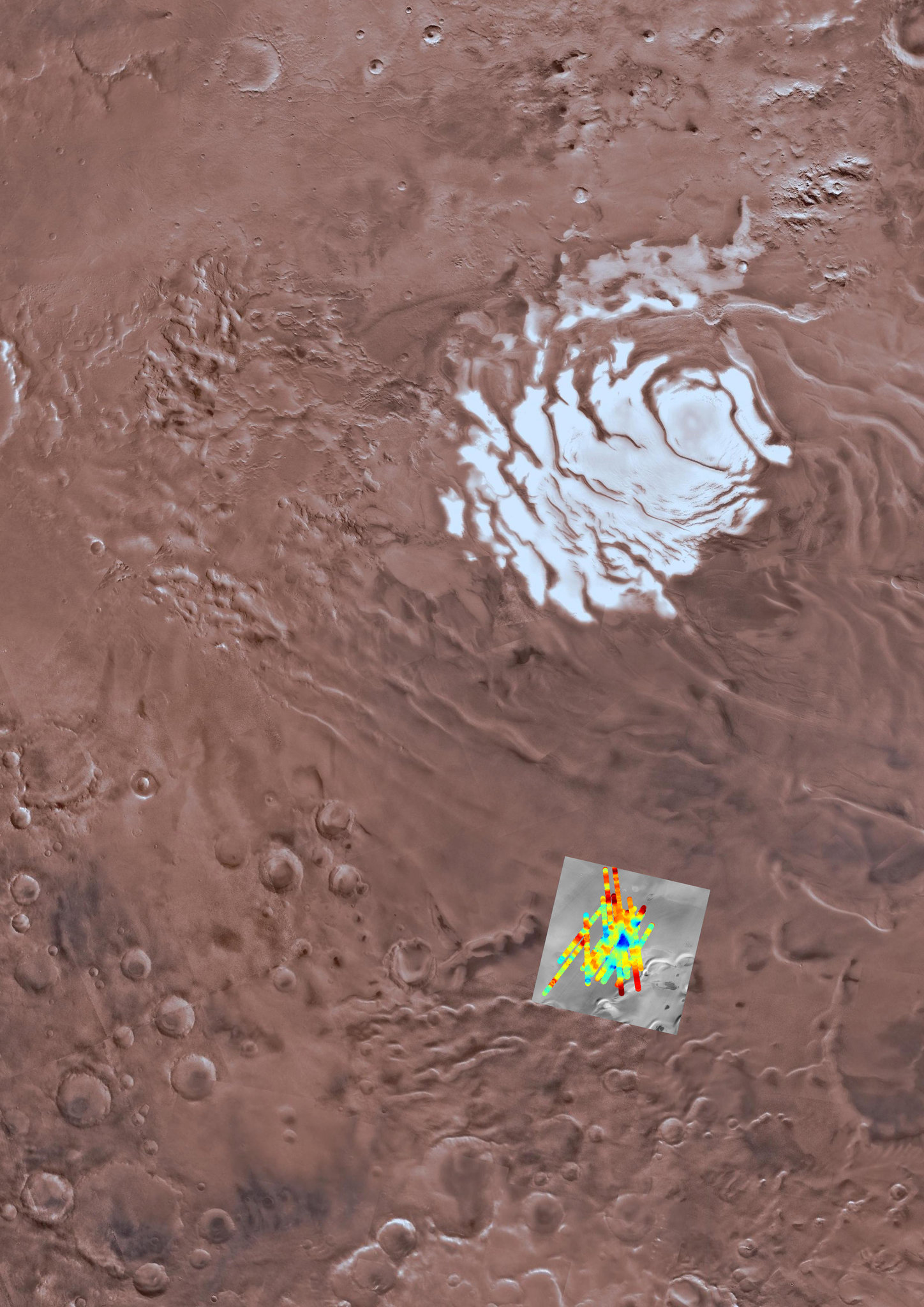
Mars SouthPole Site of Subglacial Water (25 July 2018)

On May 4, 2005, Mars Express deployed the first of its two 20-metre-long radar booms for the MARSIS experiment. At first the boom didn't lock fully into place; however, exposing it to sunlight for a few minutes on May 10 fixed the glitch. The second 20 m boom was successfully deployed on June 14. Both 20 m booms were needed to create a 40 m dipole antenna for MARSIS to work; a less crucial 7-meter-long monopole antenna was deployed on June 17. The radar booms were originally scheduled to be deployed in April 2004, but this was delayed out of fear that the deployment could damage the spacecraft through a whiplash effect. Due to the delay it was decided to split the four-week commissioning phase in two parts, with two weeks running up to July 4 and another two weeks in December 2005.

The deployment of the booms was a critical and highly complex task, requiring effective inter-agency cooperation between ESA, NASA, industry partners, and public Universities.

== Science ==
MARSIS transmits a series of modulated chirps at frequencies between 1.8 and 5.0 MHz in subsurface sounding mode, with a 1 MHz bandwidth. It also emits chirps sweeping between 0.1 and 5.4 MHz when ionosphere sounding. Depending on the mode, the pulsewidth is 30, 91 or 250 μs, and the nominal Pulse repetition frequency is 130 Hz. Transmitted power is either 1.5 or 5 W.

Nominal science observations began during July 2005.

A 2012 paper by the MARSIS team measured a difference between the dielectric constant of the northern and southern high-latitude regions. This is evidence that the material that fills the northern basin is a lower-density material, which could be interpreted as evidence of an ancient northern ocean.

Using MARSIS data, 22 Italian scientists reported in July 2018 the discovery of a subglacial lake on Mars, 1.5 km (0.93 mi) below the southern polar ice cap, and extending horizontally about 20 km (12 mi), the first known stable body of water on Mars.

Size of the MARSIS antenna (horizontal line) compared to the spacecraft and a human silhouette

== See also ==
- LRS, Lunar radar sounder (LRS) is a orbiting low frequency radar sounder and altimeter over Earth's Moon
- RIME, Radar for Icy Moons Exploration (RIME) is a orbiting low frequency radar sounder and altimeter for Jupiter's Icy moons
- SHARAD, The Mars SHAllow RADar sounder (SHARAD) radar (20 MHz) on the later launched Mars Reconnaissance Orbiter complements MARSIS capabilities.
- Tianwen-1, The Tianwen-1 mission plans an Orbiter Subsurface Radar (OSR) and rover based Ground-Penetrating Radar (GPR) for Mars
- WISDOM (radar), Water Ice and Subsurface Deposit Observation on Mars (WISDOM) is a ground-penetrating radar on the ExoMars rover
