= Planum Australe =

Planum on Mars

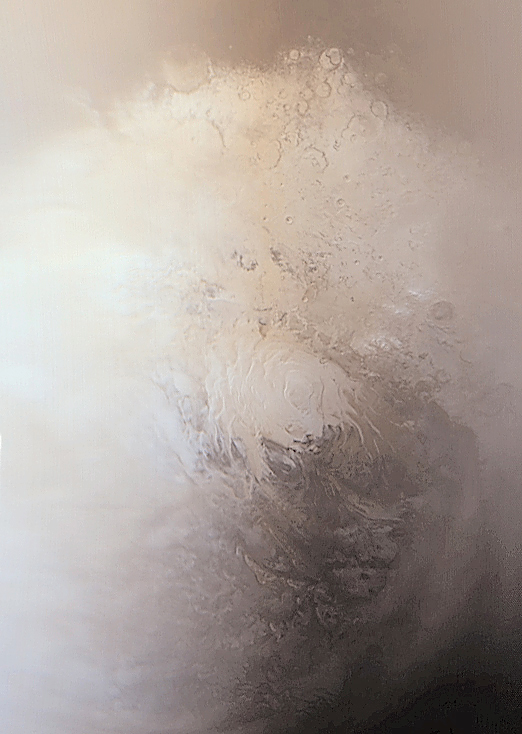
- Planum Australe, taken by Mars Global Surveyor.
- Feature type: Partially glaciated plains
- Coordinates: 83.9°S 160.0°E

Planum Australe (Latin: "the southern plain") is the southern polar plain on Mars. It extends southward of roughly 75°S and is centered at 83.9°S 160.0°E. The geology of this region was to be explored by the failed NASA mission Mars Polar Lander, which lost contact on entry into the Martian atmosphere.

In July 2018, scientists reported the discovery, based on MARSIS radar studies, of a subglacial lake on Mars, 1.5 km (0.93 mi) below the southern polar ice cap, and extending sideways about 20 km (12 mi), the first known stable body of water on the planet.

== Ice cap ==
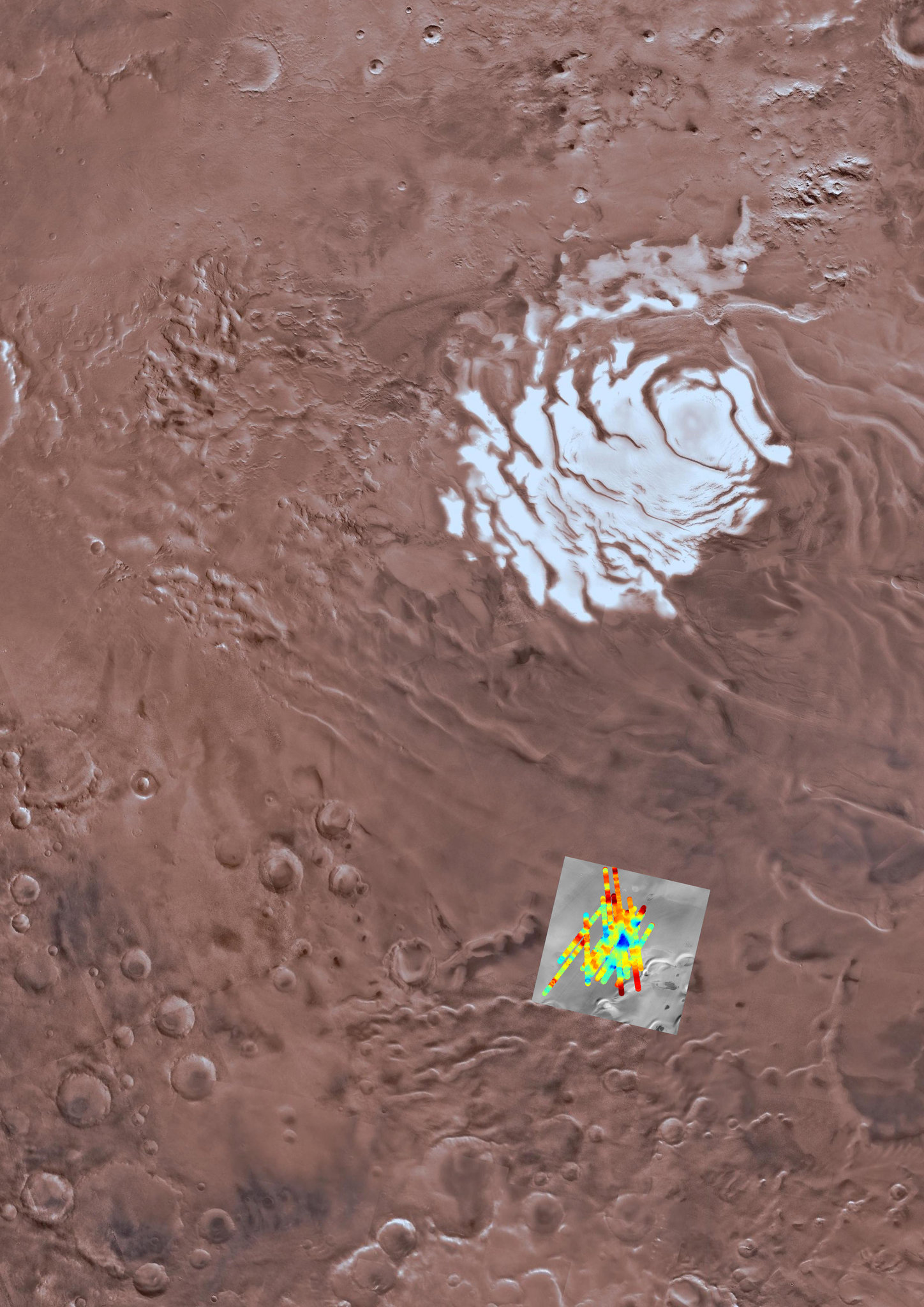
Site of south polar subglacial water body (reported July 2018)

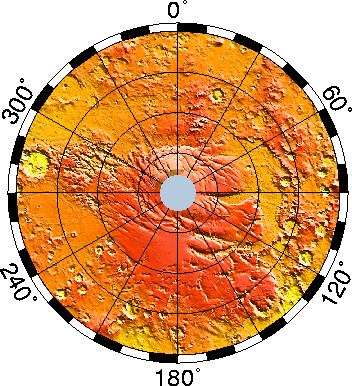
Elevation map of the south pole. Note how Planum Australe rises above the surrounding cratered terrain. Click to enlarge and for more info.

Planum Australe is partially covered by a permanent polar ice cap composed of frozen water and carbon dioxide about 3 km thick. A seasonal ice cap forms on top of the permanent one during the Martian winter, extending from 60°S southwards. It is, at the height of winter, approximately 1 meter thick. It is possible that the area of this ice cap may be shrinking due to localized climate change. Claims of more planetwide global warming based on imagery, however, ignore temperature data and global datasets. Spacecraft and microwave data indicate global average temperature is, at most, stable, and possibly cooling.

In 1966, Leighton and Murray proposed that the Martian polar caps provided a store of CO_{2} much larger than the atmospheric reservoir. However it is now thought that both polar caps are made mostly of water ice. Both poles have a thin seasonal covering of CO_{2}, while in addition the southern pole has a permanent residual CO_{2} cap, about 8 to 10 metres thick, that lies on top of the water ice. Perhaps the key argument that the bulk of the ice is water is that CO_{2} ice isn't mechanically strong enough to make a 3 km thick ice cap stable over long periods of time. Recent evidence from SHARAD ice penetrating radar has revealed a massive subsurface CO_{2} ice deposit approximately equal to 80% of the current atmosphere, or 4–5 mbar, stored in Planum Australe.

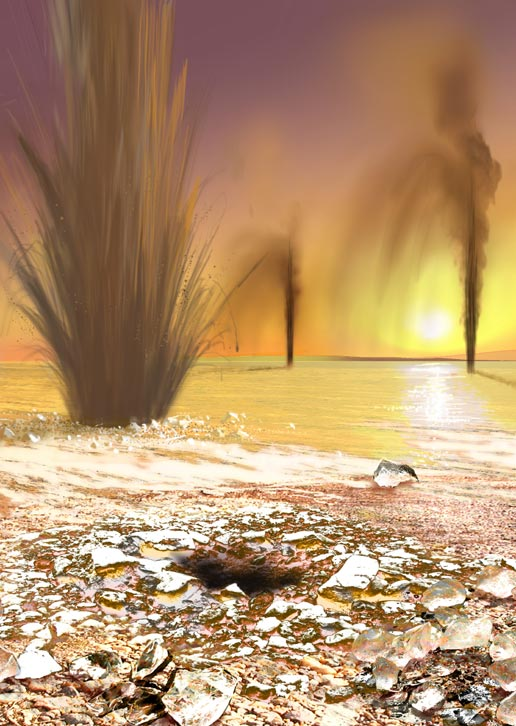
Depiction of erupting south polar sand-laden jets (Ron Miller)

Data from ESA's Mars Express indicates that there are three main parts to the ice cap. The most reflective part of the ice cap is approximately 85% dry ice and 15% water ice. The second part, where the ice cap forms steep slopes at the boundary with the surrounding plain, is almost exclusively water ice. Finally, the ice cap is surrounded by permafrost fields that extend for tens of kilometres north away from the scarps.

The centre of the permanent ice cap is not located at 90°S but rather approximately 150 kilometres north of the geographical south pole. The presence of two massive impact basins in the western hemisphere – Hellas Planitia and Argyre Planitia – creates an immobile area of low pressure over the permanent ice cap. The resulting weather patterns produce fluffy white snow which has a high albedo. This is in contrast to the black ice that forms in the eastern part of the polar region, which receives little snow.

== Features ==
There are two distinct subregions in Planum Australe – Australe Lingula and Promethei Lingula. It is dissected by canyons Promethei Chasma, Ultimum Chasma, Chasma Australe and Australe Sulci. It is theorised that these canyons were created by katabatic wind. The largest crater in Planum Australe is McMurdo Crater.

=== Geysers on Mars ===
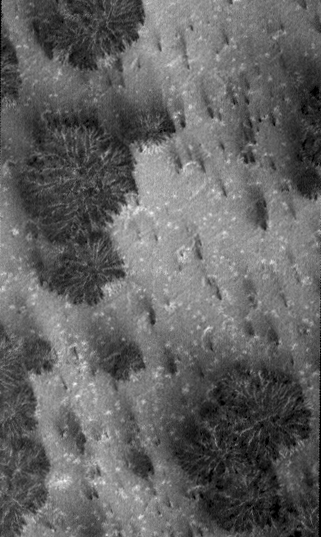
Close up of "dark dune spots" created by geyser-like systems

The seasonal frosting and defrosting of the southern ice cap results in the formation of spider-like radial channels carved on 1 meter thick ice by sunlight. Then, sublimed CO_{2} (and probably water) increase pressure in their interior, producing geyser-like eruptions of cold fluids often mixed with dark basaltic sand or mud. This process is rapid, observed happening in the space of a few days, weeks or months, a growth rate rather unusual in geology – especially for Mars. The Mars Geyser Hopper lander is a concept mission that would investigate the geysers of Mars.

=== Saltwater lakes ===
In September 2020, scientists confirmed the existence of several large saltwater lakes under the ice in the south polar region of the planet Mars. According to one of the researchers, “We identified the same body of water [as suggested earlier in a preliminary initial detection], but we also found three other bodies of water around the main one ... It’s a complex system.”

== See also ==
- Climate of Mars
- List of plains on Mars
- Martian polar ice caps
- Planum Boreum, the northern polar plain
