= Louth (crater) =

Crater on Mars

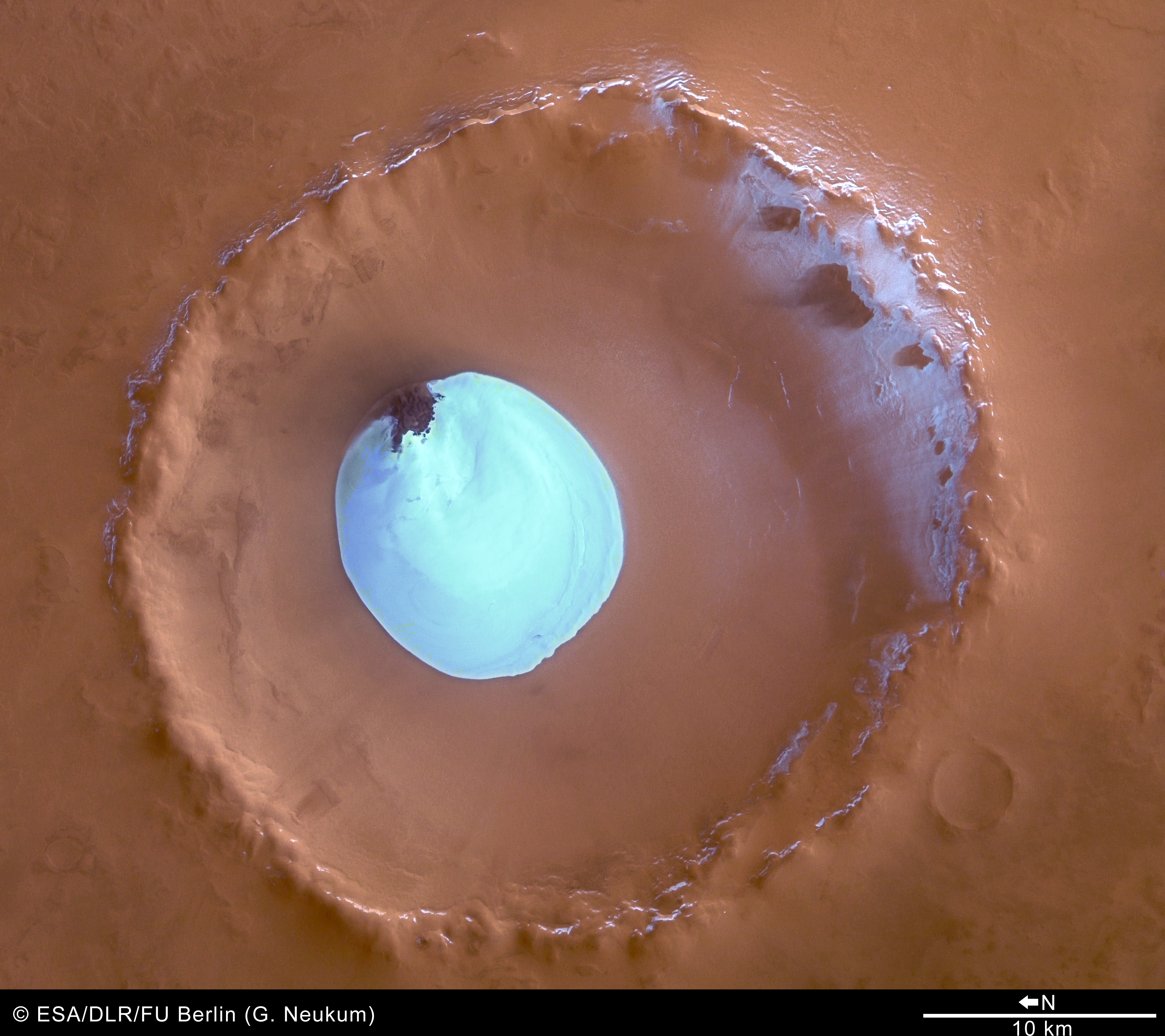
- Color photograph of Louth by the HRSC on ESA's Mars Express
- Planet: Mars
- Coordinates: 70.19°N 103.24°E
- Quadrangle: Mare Boreum
- Diameter: 36.29 km (22.55 mi)
- Eponym: Louth, Ireland

Louth (/laʊð/) is an impact crater on Mars located at 70.19°N 103.24°E in the Mare Boreum quadrangle. Located within Vastitas Borealis, the crater has a diameter of 36.29 kilometres (22.55 miles) and is named after Louth, a town in Ireland.

Louth's characteristic feature is the persistent ice mound at the center of the crater. The central ice mound is the closest to the equator of all analogous features on the Martian surface, and of particular relevance to researchers studying climatic variability on the planet's surface. Many theories exist for the creation and persisting nature of the ice mound, with the predominant explanation being that of advected water vapor being deposited over the crater's surface by southwesterly winds. Due to its particular interest to scientists, two mission drafts have been proposed to explore the crater's makeup.

== Discovery ==
First known from Viking images featuring an anomalous albedo feature at the center of a crater in the northern plains of Mars, the deposit of ice was identified as being made of water ice by Xie et al. in 2006 through analysis of Thermal Emission Imaging System (THEMIS) data. The researchers, who used similar techniques to their predecessors who had similarly determined the existence of water ice in the Martian polar ice caps, additionally noted the seasonal fluctuation of the central ice mound between the Martian fall and summer.

== Ice mound ==
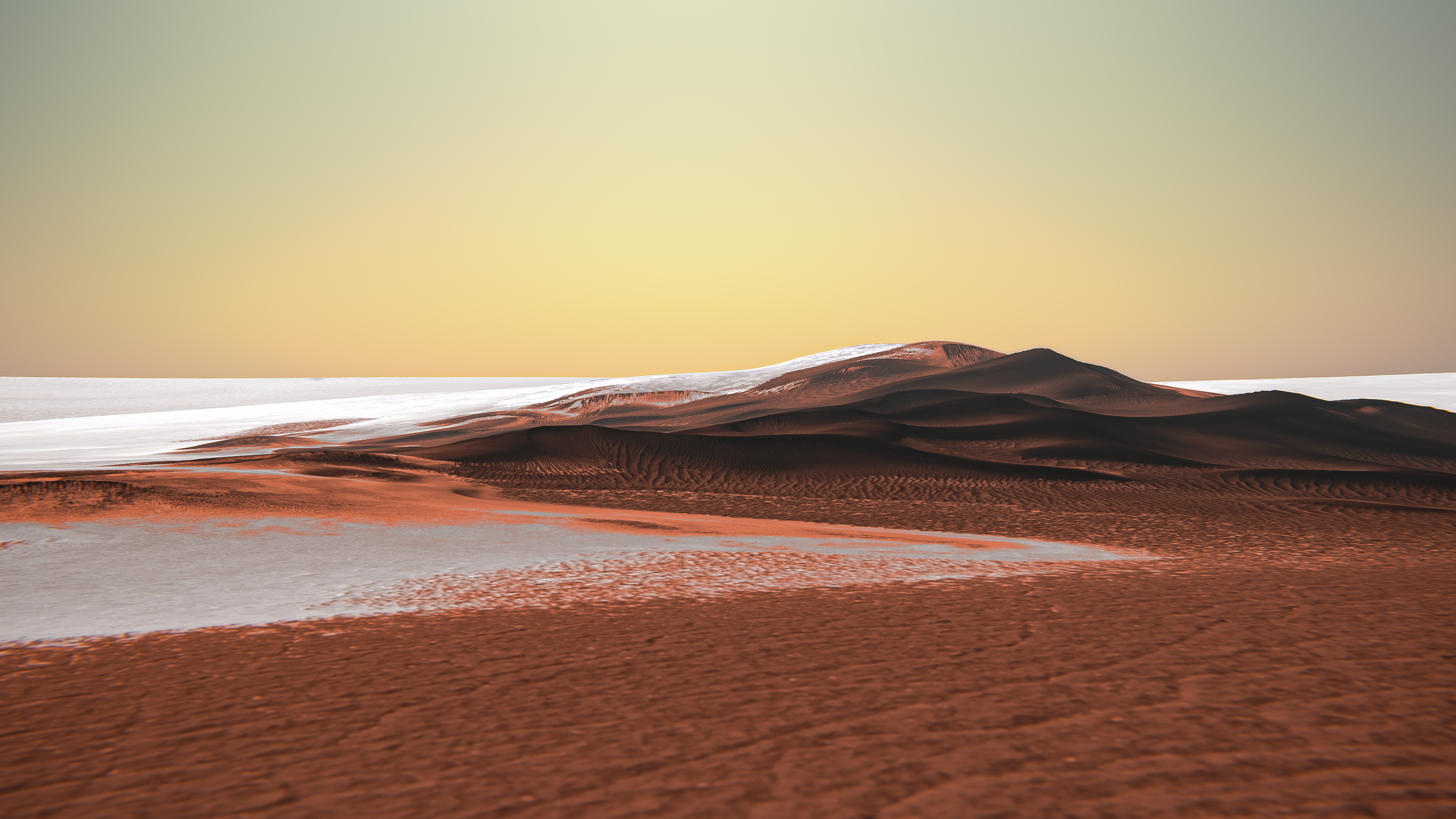
A simulated surface-level view of Louth's ice mound using HiRISE data

Louth contains the lowest-latitude permanent deposit of water ice on the Martian surface, in a mound situated at the crater's center. The mound is quasi-circular and has an approximate diameter of 10 kilometres (6.2 miles). The steady-state value for the albedo of the central ice mound is 0.431. The mound consists of smaller ice grains interspersed with more palagonite contaminant at its edge, compared to the center. Large grains of ice suggest that the central portion is the oldest in age, and brought to the surface either through the sublimation of ice or aeolian processes. The water ice at the center of the crater as analyzed through spectral modelling determined that the water ice at the center of the mound was 99-percent pure at the optical surface. The ice mound was determined to be similar in texture and composition to the northern polar ice cap. Studies of the crater's interior, knowing their similar makeup, can yield insight on the interaction between the north polar region and the atmosphere. Additionally, craters with ice mounds such as Louth can serve as records of the Amazonian era of Martian geology. Craters like Louth have been used as potential analogues for understanding similar processes occurring on Pluto.

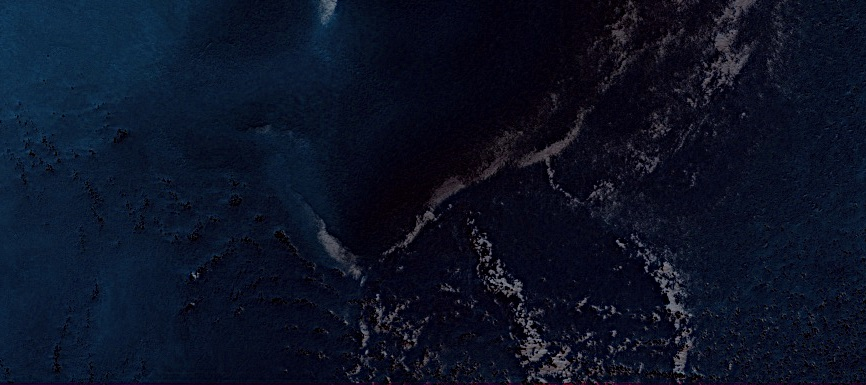
Detail of the frost patch and dunes in Louth (Mars Reconnaissance Orbiter HiRISE)

The ice mound is divided into four feature types: smooth interior ice, irregular "trough-bearing" ice, sand dunes, and "stucco" rough ice. One feature of the central mound are elongate features interpreted to be sastrugi, that being windswept ice mound and groove features. Unlike sand dunes, whose ridges are perpendicular to the direction of the wind, the ridges of sastrugi are parallel. The variation in albedo featured by the aforementioned sastrugi that was observed by Brown et al. was not understood at this point. Another feature of the central mound is that of a cluster of dark sand dunes at the edge of the deposit, water ice was found to have deposited likely after the formation of the dunes. The formation of the dune system is not fully understood, and multiple theories exist for their formation. This includes their formation prior to the ice mound's creation, their formation after the ice mound and the ice found on the dunes is simply frost, or the dunes are a product of material left behind after another material sublimated. It was later found that ice mound exchanges water ice from the surrounding regolith. Ice that was described as resembling stucco was thought to be the youngest portion of the water ice mound. Arcuate features within the stucco ice is thought to represent the growth of the ice mound, similar to other features known as north polar layered deposits (NPLD) found in other Martian craters. The northern border of the ice mound is abrupt in its transition to the regolith, the southern border in comparison, is diffuse. Anomalous "defrosting spots" that persist into the summer are present in Louth, akin to features in other Martian polar regions, the features, which resemble dark smudges, are not fully explained.

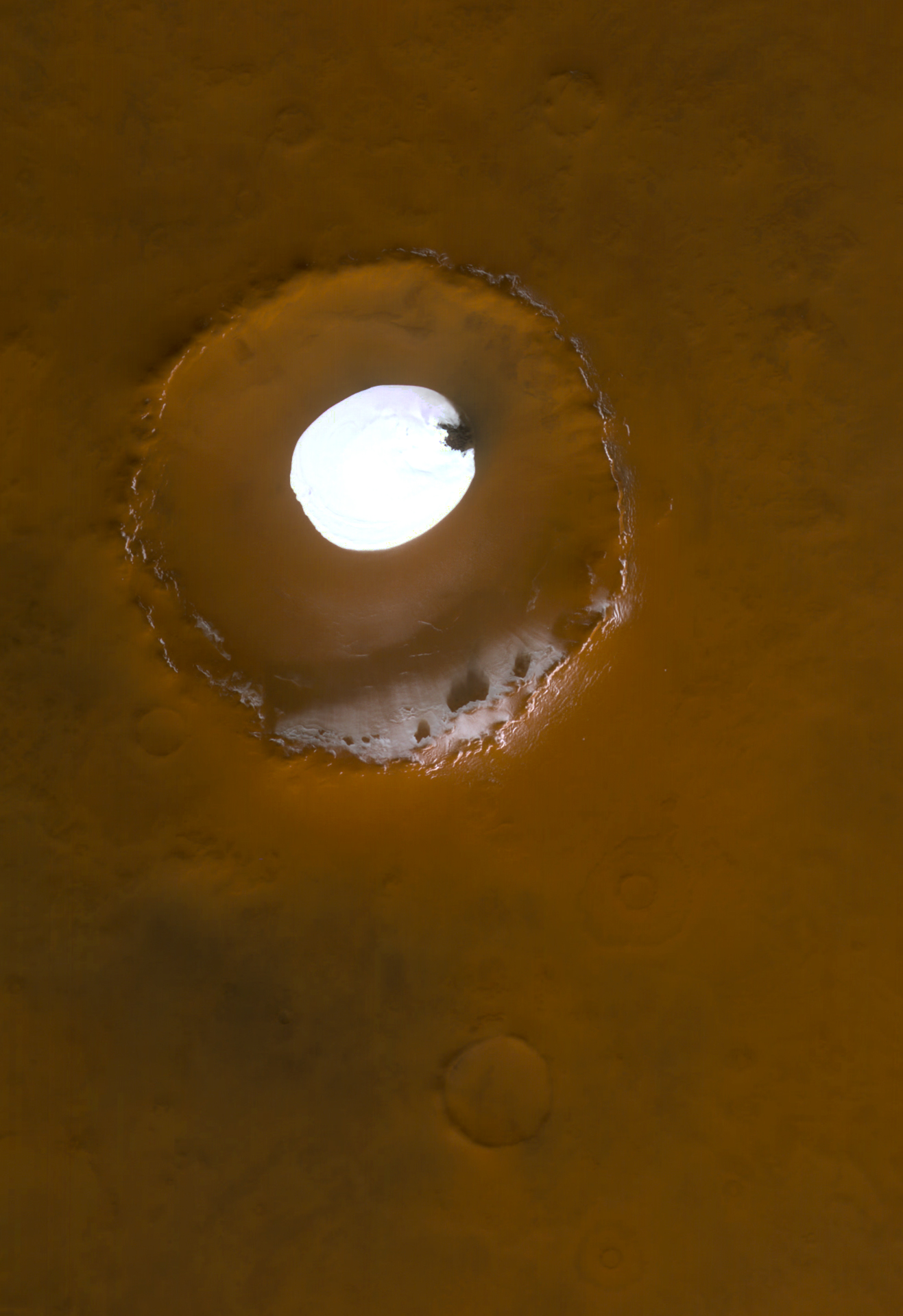
Color photograph of Louth from ESA's Mars Express (February 2, 2005)

Its low latitude compared to other Martian craters with similar features make Louth and its ice mound the warmest perennial surface of ice on the Martian surface. Ice deposits on Mars serve as unique indicators for the climate variability on the Martian surface, due to their status as reservoirs for chemical compounds like carbon dioxide and water. Louth's southerly position of 70 degrees north latitude gives it a unique potential for sensitivity to climatic changes on Mars. The processes behind its long-term stability, especially at its southerly latitude is poorly understood. Following a study by Brown et al., Louth's inner ice mound was determined to be currently in retreat, and the remnants of a once much larger ice mound at the center of the crater. Observations of Louth over four years failed to find any growth or retreat of the ice mound. The mound at the center changes seasonally, with non-uniform changes occurring dependent on the season. Water that has sublimated from the regolith of Mars recondenses on a crescent-shaped periphery of the mound, which is colder than its surroundings. Southwesterly winds, through the process of advection, deposit water vapor over the mound. During the Martian summer, it is thought the mound undergoes the process of ablation until Solar longitude (L_{s}) 150. The rate is thought, for an angle of around 7 degrees and on the equatorial-facing side, to be around 2 millimetres (0.079 in) yearly.

=== Formation ===
The processes of how the crater came to have the water ice mound in the first place is thought to be a result of atmospheric deposition of water vapor at the crater's surface. Seasonally, a polar hood with atmospheric water is incorporated into the frost cap of the northern Martian pole, water comes loose as the cap retreats. A ring of water frost forms as the cap retreats, and sweeps over craters in the process. This process was thought to be more likely than the idea of Louth being an outlier from a larger polar cap, or water deposited by aeolian processes from a feature dubbed "Mrs. Chippy's Ring", which was too far from Louth to likely be the source. Follow up studies in 2021 suggested a similar conclusion, with additional findings that the ice mound casts a shadow in a process dubbed "self-shadowing", which either prevented further ablation or promoted the precipitation of water ice. Other theories proposed for the formation of the central mound include: upwelling from an underground Martian aquifer, akin to the formation of pingos on Earth, and melting of surface ice due to impact-induced hydrothermal activity.

== Exploration ==
There is no active or currently developed mission that explicitly cites Louth as a potential target. Due to its unique features, however, there have been several mission proposals to explore the crater. HEMERA (Human Exploration of Martian Environment, Regolith, and Atmosphere) is a proposal to land humans on the northern polar region of Mars, with Louth as the landing site. Astronauts would then be tasked with determining the purity of the water ice mound as per the mission objectives through collection of regolith. Another proposal, dubbed MICKEY (Mars Ice Core Key Exploration Yacht), is a proposed sample-return mission that would obtain an ice core from the mound at the crater's center. Along with a lander, MICKEY would deploy a rover inside the crater to search for ice.

Louth has been photographed by Mars-orbiting satellites, including Viking, Mars Express, and the Mars Reconnaissance Orbiter (MRO). Both Mars Express and the MRO contributed data that was significant to understanding the surface dynamics of the crater.

== Etymology ==
In accordance with the approved naming conventions, smaller Martian craters including Louth are named after towns and villages on Earth with an approximate population of fewer than 100,000 people. The crater is named after Louth, a town in County Louth, Ireland. Unofficially known by the name Louth before it was officially approved, the crater was formally named by the International Astronomical Union's Working Group for Planetary System Nomenclature on February 7, 2007.

== Gallery ==
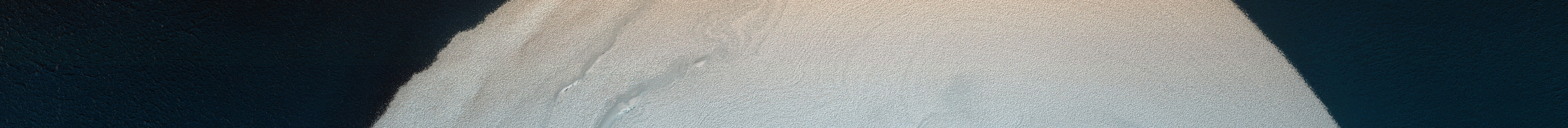
Enigmatic Sinuous Features in Louth Crater Ice Mound, Mars Reconnaissance Orbiter HiRISE
(August 4, 2010).
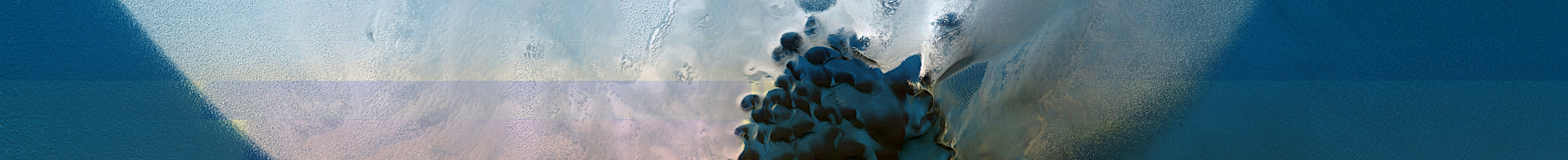
East Louth Crater Ice and Dune Monitoring, Mars Reconnaissance Orbiter HiRISE
(September 4, 2021)
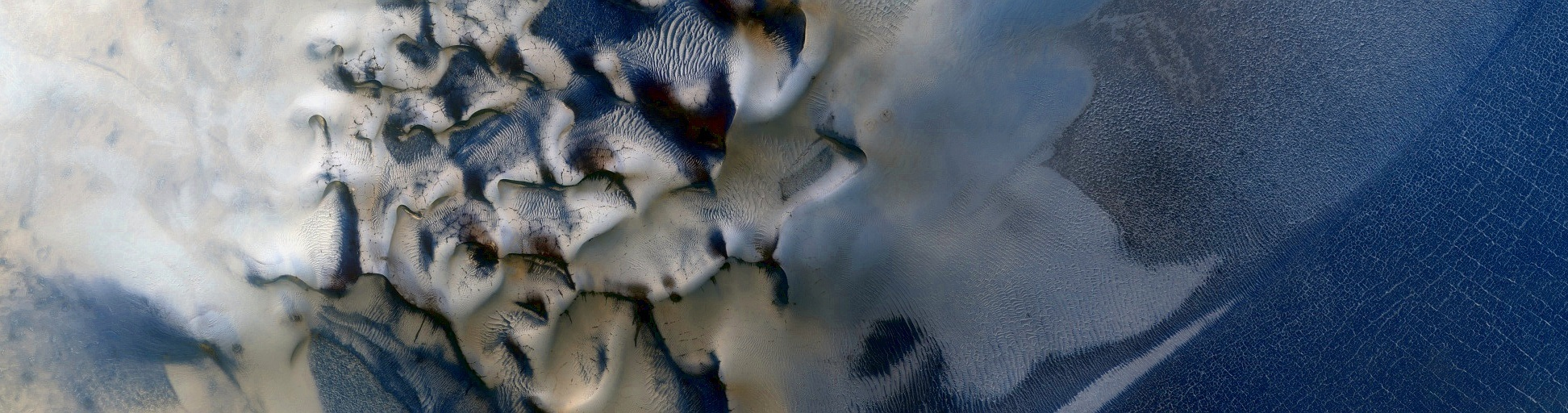
Changing Frost Patterns in Louth Crater, Mars Reconnaissance Orbiter HiRISE
(May 7, 2008).

== See also ==
- Climate of Mars
- Korolev, another crater found within Mare Boreum with a large deposit of water ice at its center.
- Water on Mars
