= Korolev (Martian crater) =

Crater on Mars

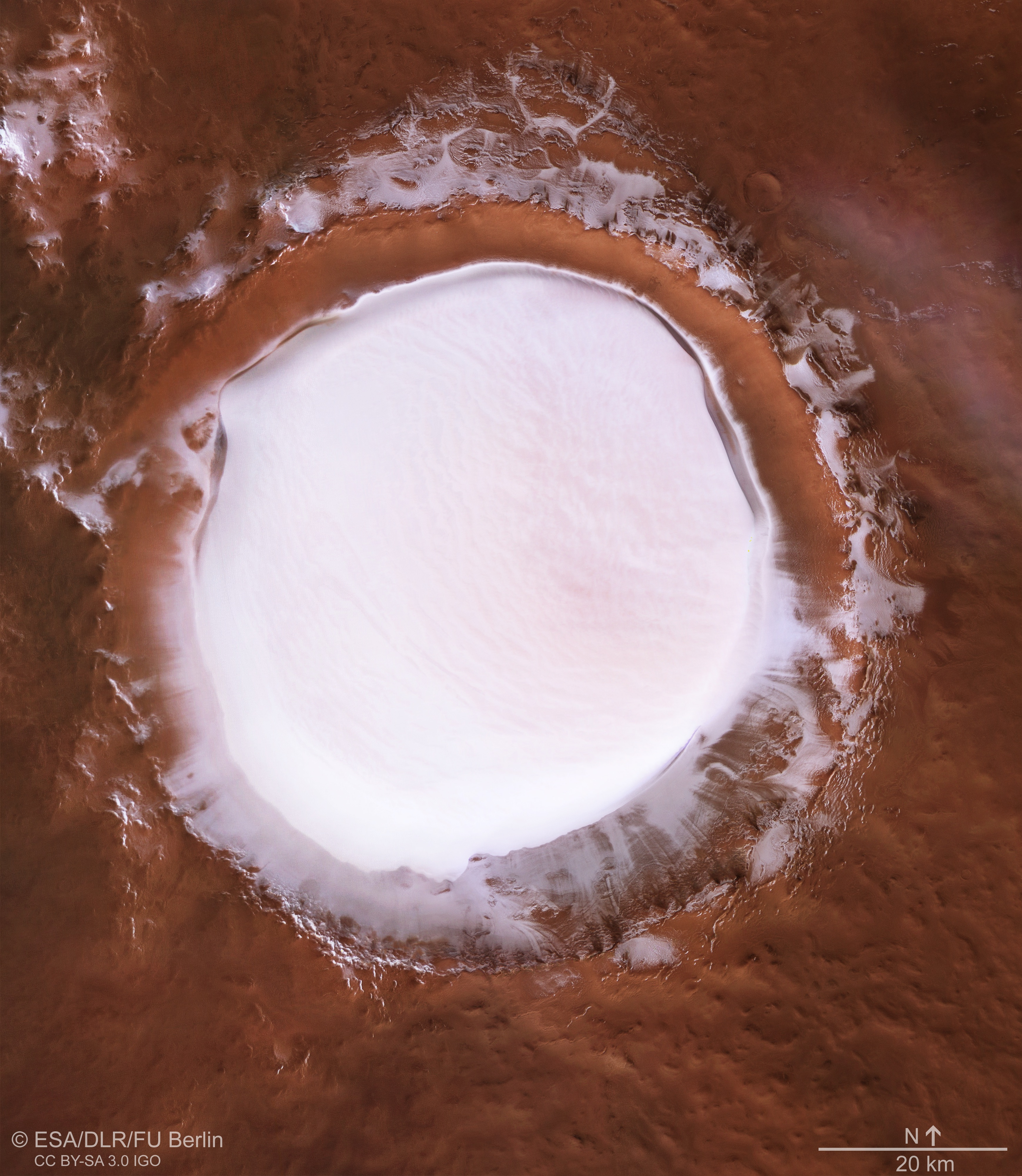
- Natural color view of Korolev crater from Mars Express
- Feature type: Impact crater
- Location: Mare Boreum quadrangle, Mars
- Coordinates: 72.77°N 164.58°E
- Diameter: 81.4 kilometres (50.6 mi)
- Eponym: Sergei Korolev (1907–1966), Soviet rocket engineer and designer

Korolev is an ice-filled impact crater in the Mare Boreum quadrangle of Mars, located at 73° north latitude and 165° east longitude. It is 81.4 kilometres (50.6 mi) in diameter and contains about 2,200 cubic kilometres (530 mi^{3}) of water ice, comparable in volume to Great Bear Lake in northern Canada. The crater was named after Sergei Korolev (1907–1966), the head Soviet rocket engineer and designer during the Space Race in the 1950s and 1960s.

Korolev crater is located on the Planum Boreum, the northern polar plain which surrounds the north polar ice cap, near the Olympia Undae dune field. The crater rim rises about 2 kilometres (1.2 mi) above the surrounding plains. The crater floor lies about 2 kilometres (1.2 mi) below the rim, and is covered by a 1.8-kilometre-deep (1.1 mi) central mound of permanent water ice, up to 60 kilometres (37 mi) in diameter.

== Ice formation ==
The ice is permanently stable because the crater acts as a natural cold trap. The thin Martian air above the crater ice is colder than air surrounding the crater; the colder local atmosphere is also heavier so it sinks to form a protective layer, insulating the ice, shielding it from melting and evaporation. Research published in 2016 indicates that the ice deposit formed in place within the crater and was not previously part of a once-larger polar ice sheet. The ice in the crater is part of the vast water resources at the poles of the planet.

== In popular culture ==
In the TV show For All Mankind, Korolev crater is the location of methane deposits that main character Kelly Baldwin seeks to investigate for signs of life.

== Gallery ==
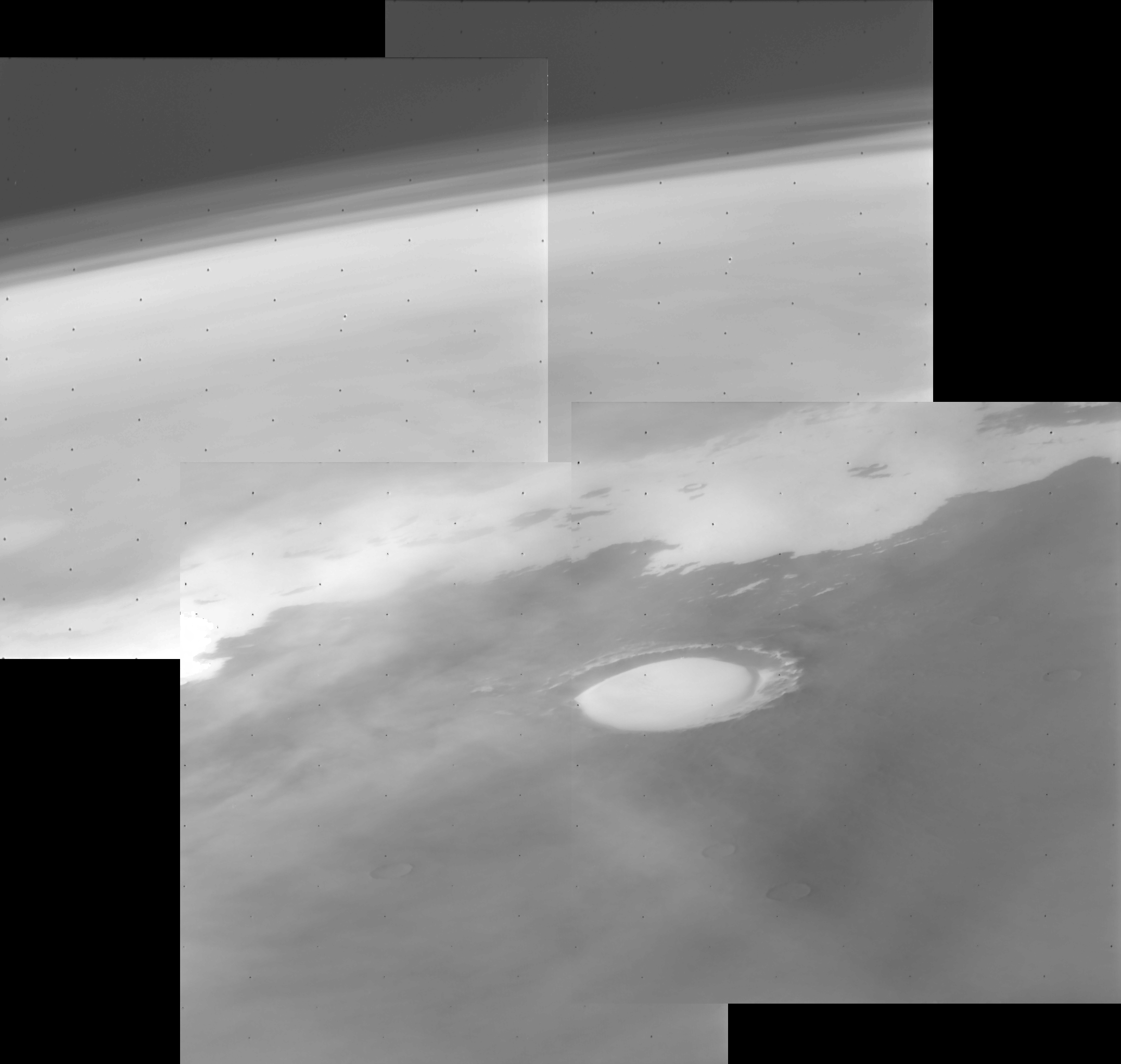
Viking Orbiter 2 mosaic (1976)

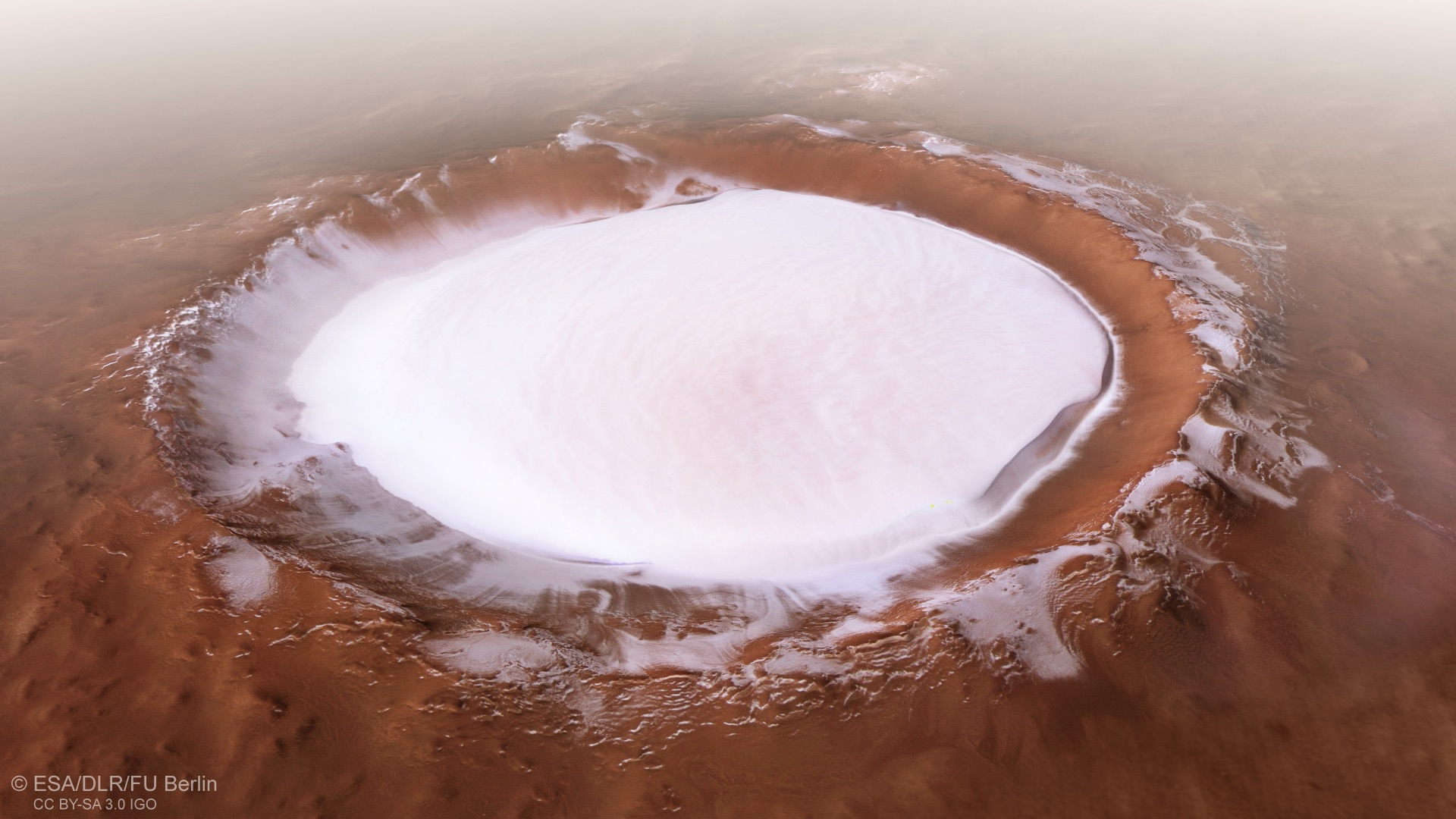
Perspective view of Korolev crater, generated using images and digital terrain data from Mars Express

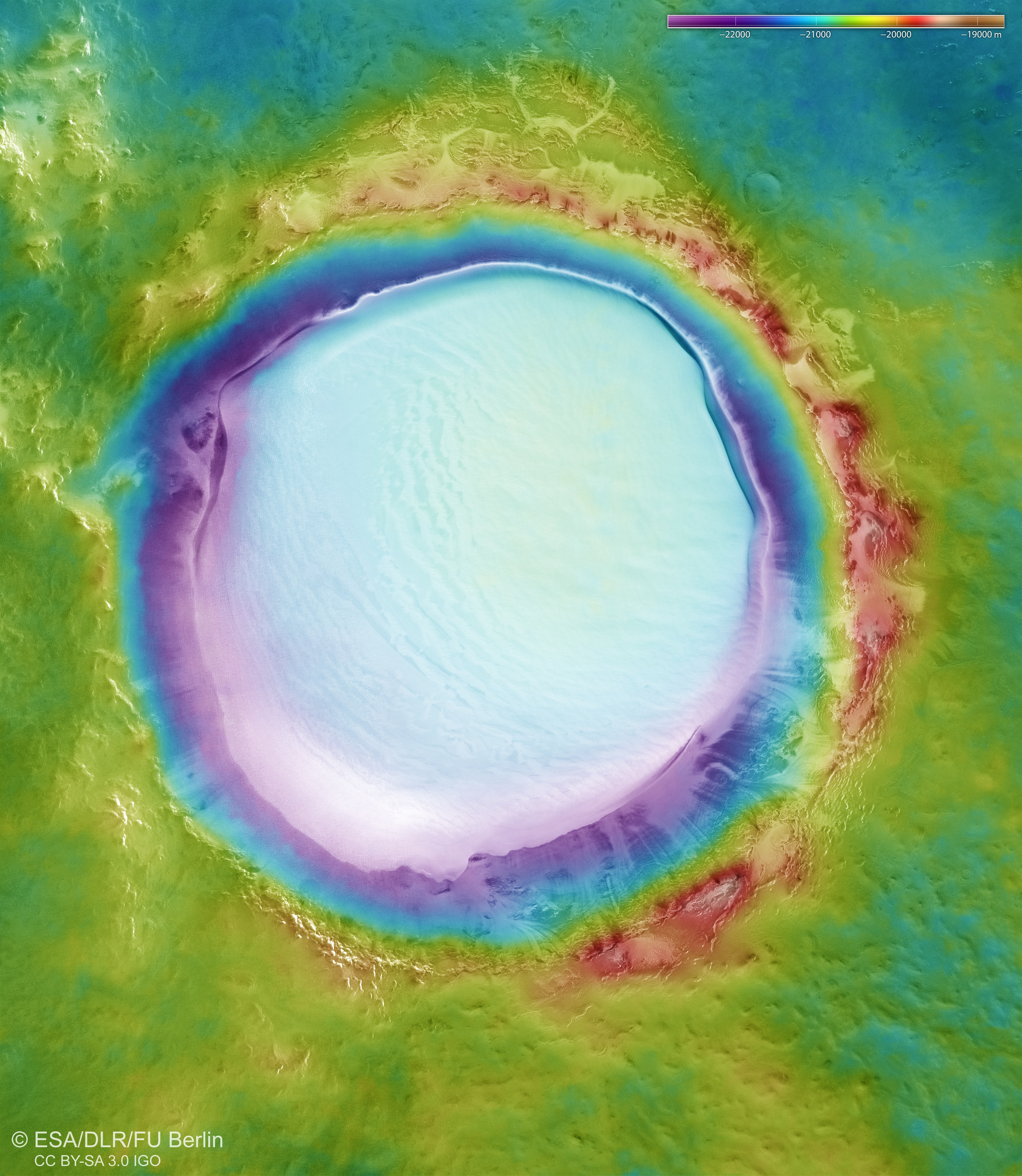
Color-coded topographic view of Korolev crater based on a digital terrain model from Mars Express data

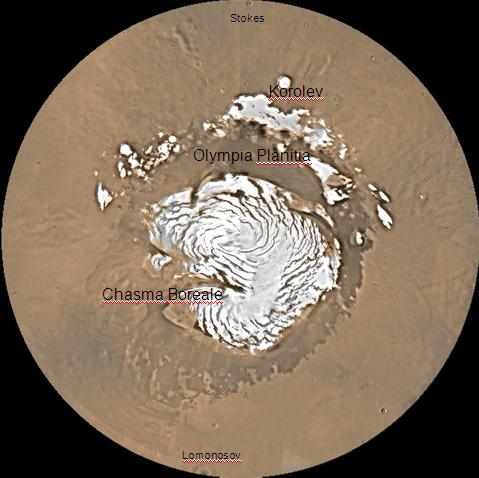
Map of Mare Boreum quadrangle with major features and craters labeled

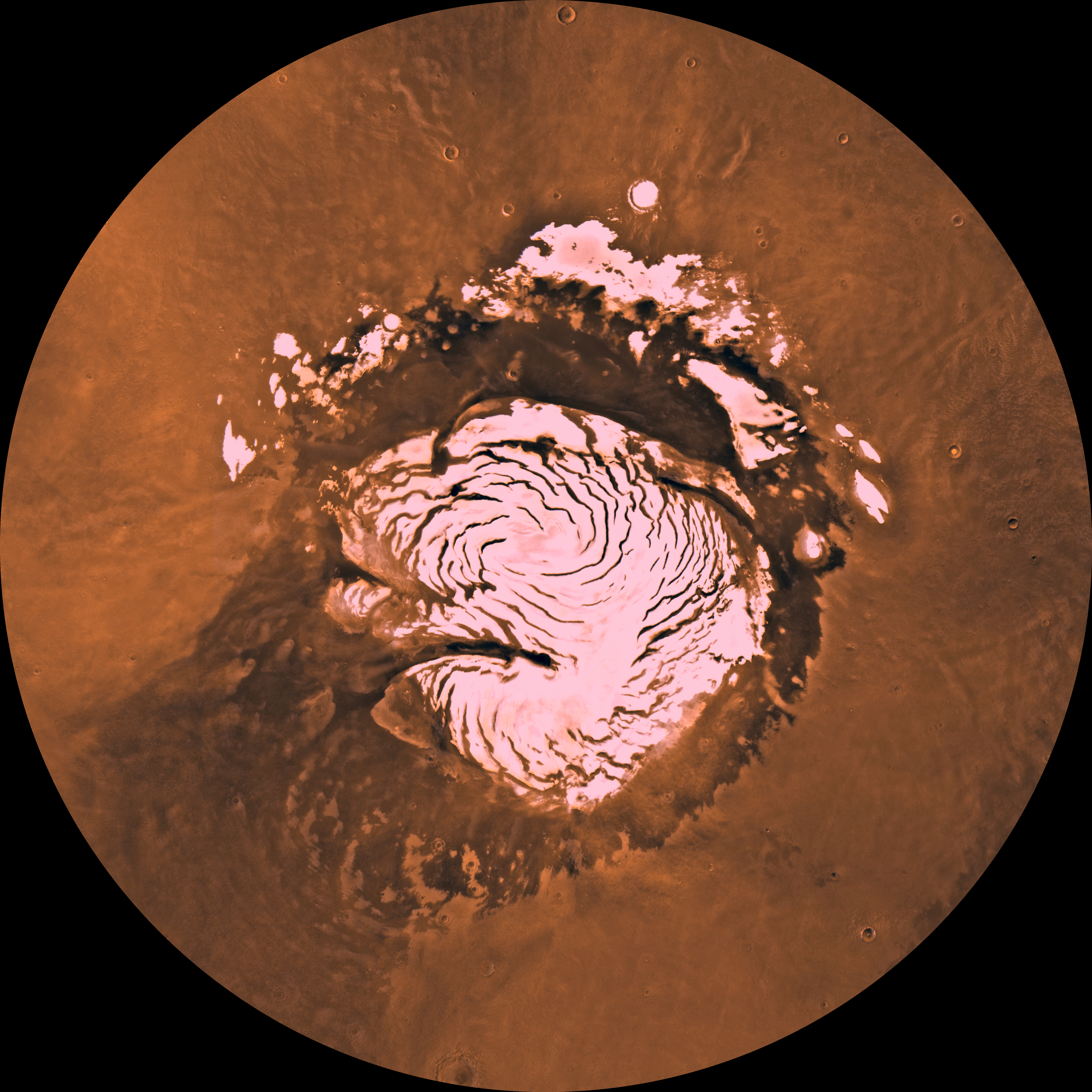
High-resolution image mosaic of Mare Boreum quadrangle from the Viking Orbiter

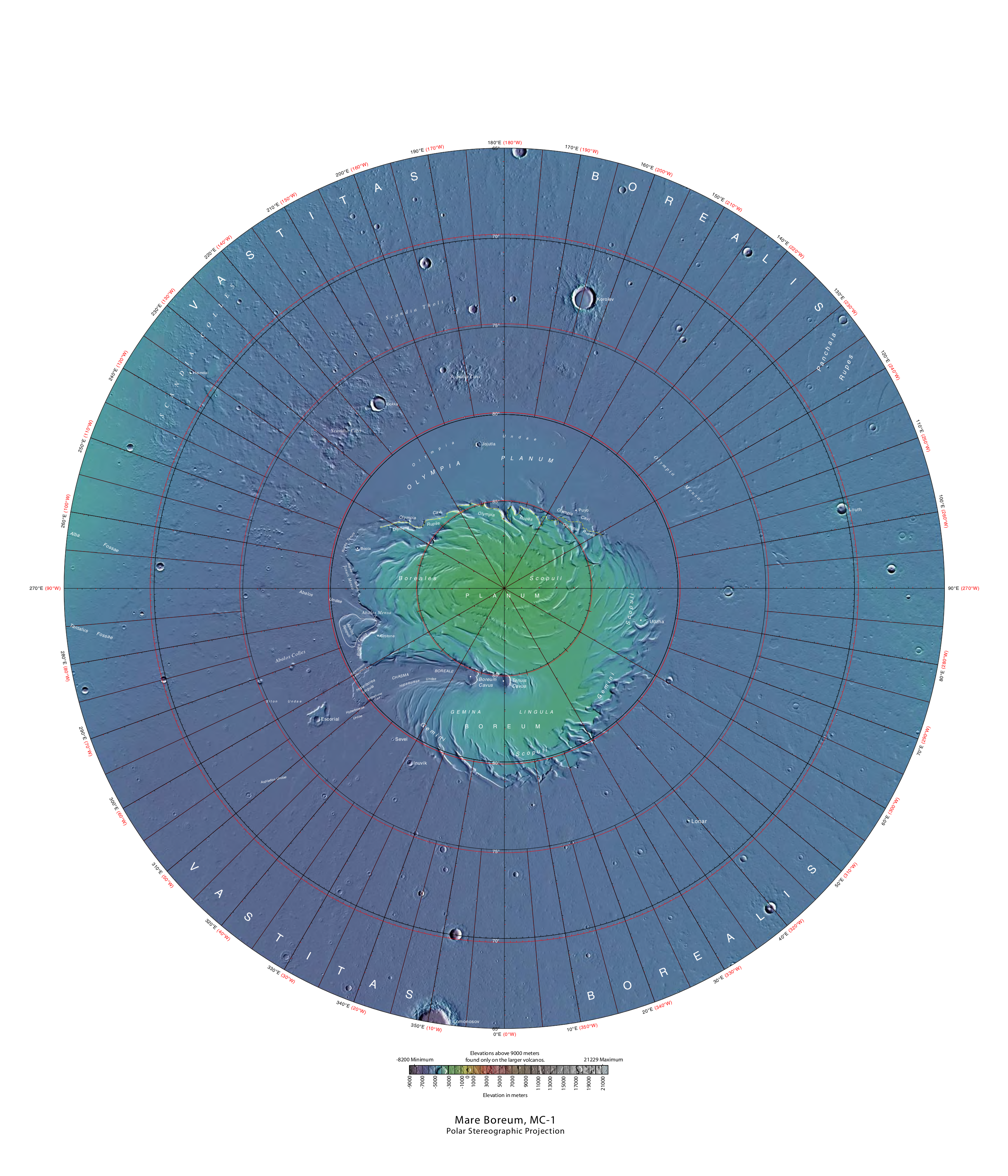
High-resolution topographic map of Mare Boreum quadrangle with features and craters labeled, from Mars Orbiter Laser Altimeter (MOLA) data

== See also ==
- 1855 Korolev, minor planet
- Korolev (lunar crater)
- Louth, another Martian crater with large ice patch
