= Mare Boreum quadrangle =

Map of Mars

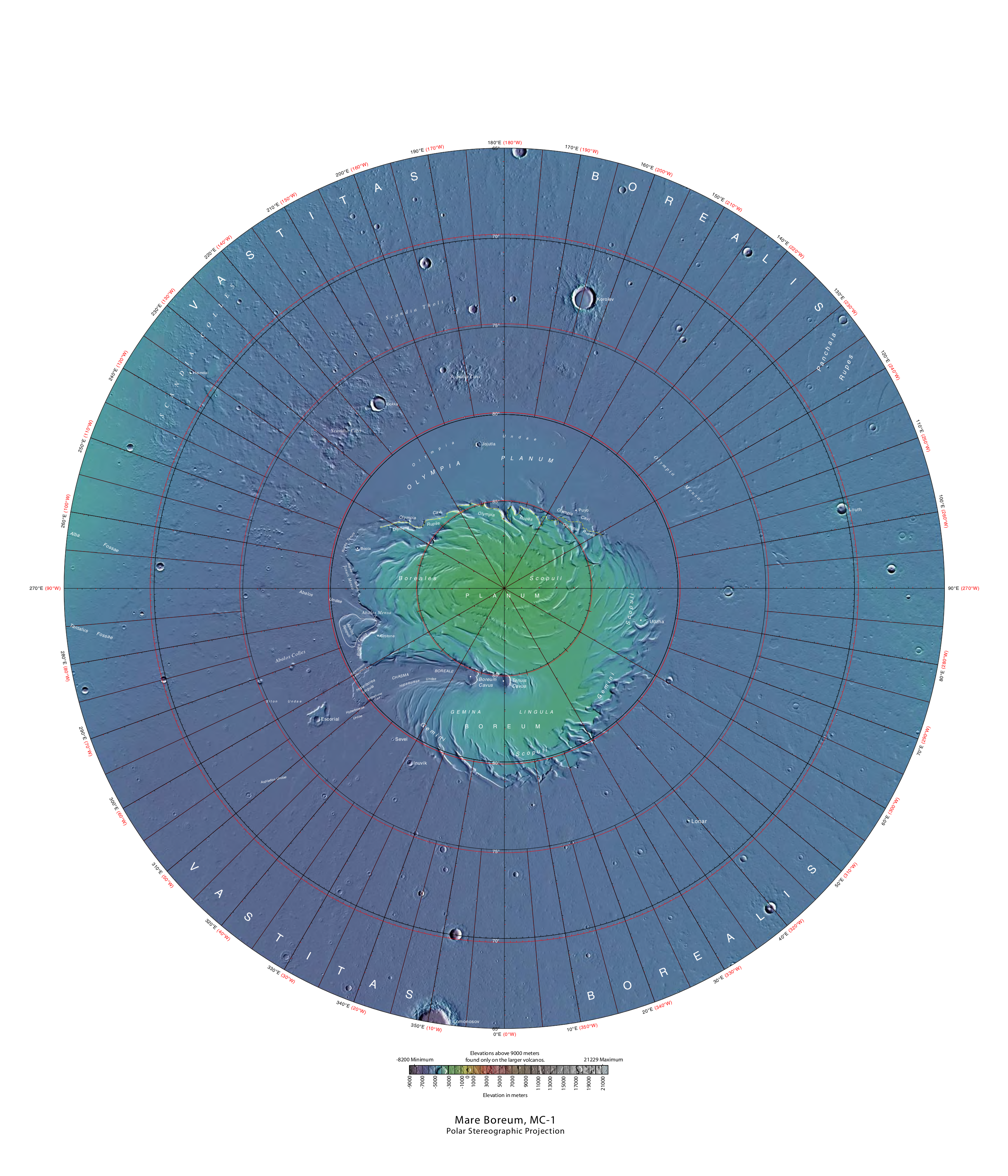
- Map of Mare Boreum quadrangle from Mars Orbiter Laser Altimeter (MOLA) data. The highest elevations are red and the lowest are blue.
- Coordinates: 75°N 0°E

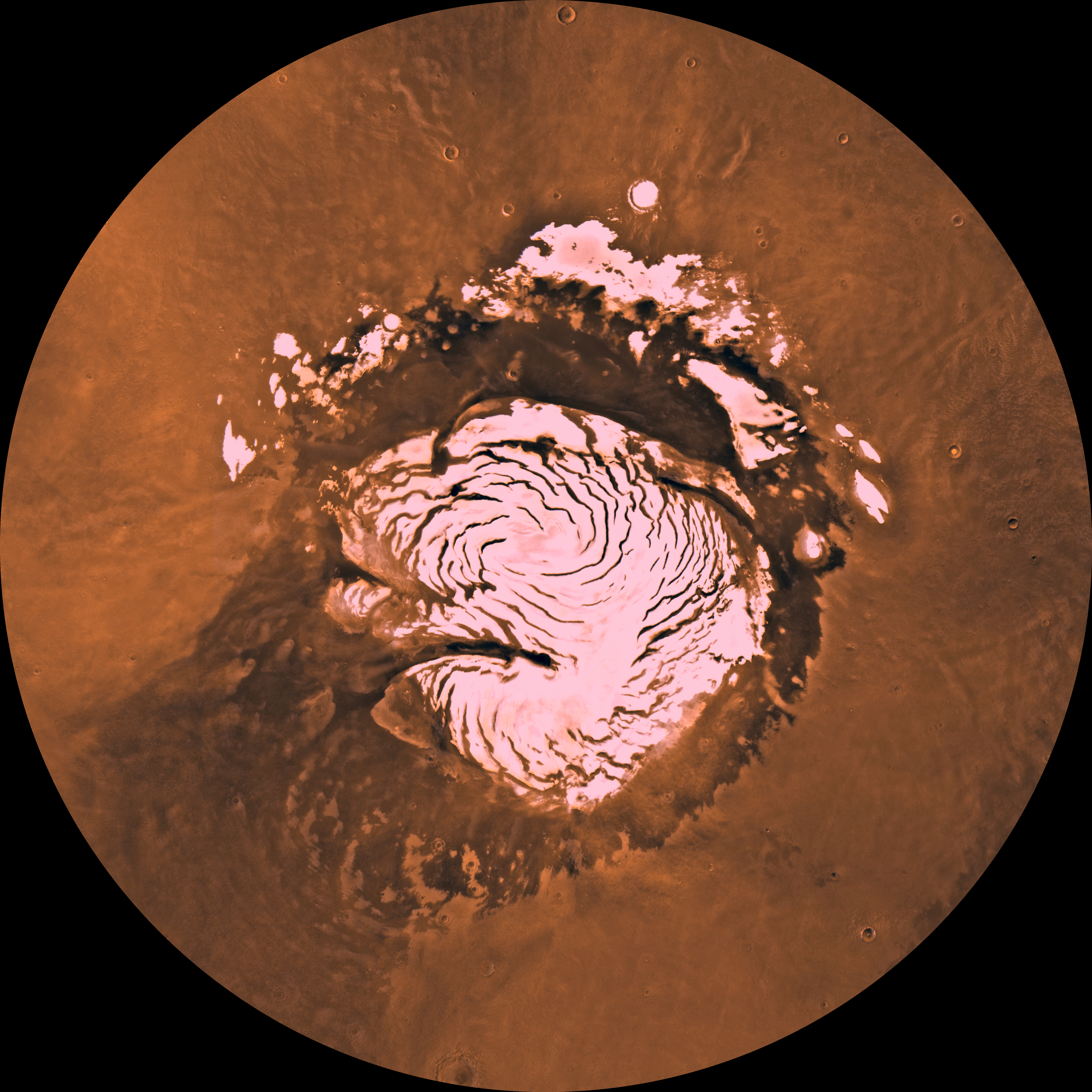
Image of the Mare Boreum Quadrangle (MC-1). The region includes the North Polar ice cap, Korolev crater and Chasma Boreale.

The Mare Boreum quadrangle is one of a series of 30 quadrangle maps of Mars used by the United States Geological Survey (USGS) Astrogeology Research Program. The Mare Boreum quadrangle is also referred to as MC-1 (Mars Chart-1). Its name derives from an older name for a feature that is now called Planum Boreum, a large plain surrounding the polar cap.

The quadrangle covers all of the Martian surface north of latitude 65°. It includes the north polar ice cap, which has a swirl pattern and is roughly 1,100 kilometres (680 miles) across. Mariner 9 in 1972 discovered a belt of sand dunes that ring the polar ice deposits, which is 500 kilometres (310 miles) across in some places and may be the largest dune field in the Solar System. The ice cap is surrounded by the vast plains of Planum Boreum and Vastitas Borealis. Close to the pole, there is a large valley, Chasma Boreale, that may have been formed from water melting from the ice cap. An alternative view is that it was made by winds coming off the cold pole. Another prominent feature is a smooth rise, formerly called Olympia Planitia. In the summer, a dark collar around the residual cap becomes visible; it is mostly caused by dunes. The quadrangle includes some very large craters that stand out in the north because the area is smooth with little change in topography. These large craters are Lomonosov and Korolev. Although smaller, the crater Stokes is also prominent.

The Phoenix lander landed on Vastitas Borealis within the Mare Boreum quadrangle at 68.218830° N and 234.250778° E on May 25, 2008. The probe collected and analyzed soil samples in an effort to detect water and determine how hospitable the planet might once have been for life to grow. It remained active there until winter conditions became too harsh around five months later.

After the mission ended the journal Science reported that chloride, bicarbonate, magnesium, sodium potassium, calcium, and possibly sulfate were detected in the samples analyzed by Phoenix. The pH was narrowed down to 7.7±0.5. Perchlorate (ClO_{4}), a strong oxidizer at elevated temperatures, was detected. This was a significant discovery because the chemical has the potential of being used for rocket fuel and as a source of oxygen for future colonists. Also, under certain conditions perchlorate can inhibit life; however some microorganisms obtain energy from the substance (by anaerobic reduction). The chemical when mixed with water can greatly lower freezing points, in a manner similar to how salt is applied to roads to melt ice. So, perchlorate may be allowing small amounts of liquid water to form on Mars today. Gullies, which are common in certain areas of Mars, may have formed from perchlorate melting ice and causing water to erode soil on steep slopes.

Much direct evidence was found for water at this location.

== Freezing of atmosphere ==
Research based on slight changes in the orbits of spacecraft around Mars over 16 years found that when one hemisphere experiences winter, approximately 3 trillion to 4 trillion tons of carbon dioxide freezes out of the atmosphere onto the northern and southern polar caps. This represents 12 to 16 percent of the mass of the entire Martian atmosphere. These observation support predictions from the Mars Global Reference Atmospheric Model—2010.

== Proof for ocean ==
Strong evidence for a one time ancient ocean was found in Mare Boreum near the north pole (as well as the south pole). In March 2015, a team of scientists published results showing that this region was highly enriched with deuterium, heavy hydrogen, by seven times as much as the Earth. This means that Mars has lost a volume of water 6.5 times what is stored in today's polar caps. The water for a time would have formed an ocean in the low-lying Mare Boreum. The amount of water could have covered the planet about 140 meters, but was probably in an ocean that in places would be almost 1 mile deep.

This international team used ESO's Very Large Telescope, along with instruments at the W. M. Keck Observatory and the NASA Infrared Telescope Facility, to map out different forms of water in Mars's atmosphere over a six-year period.

== Ice cap ==
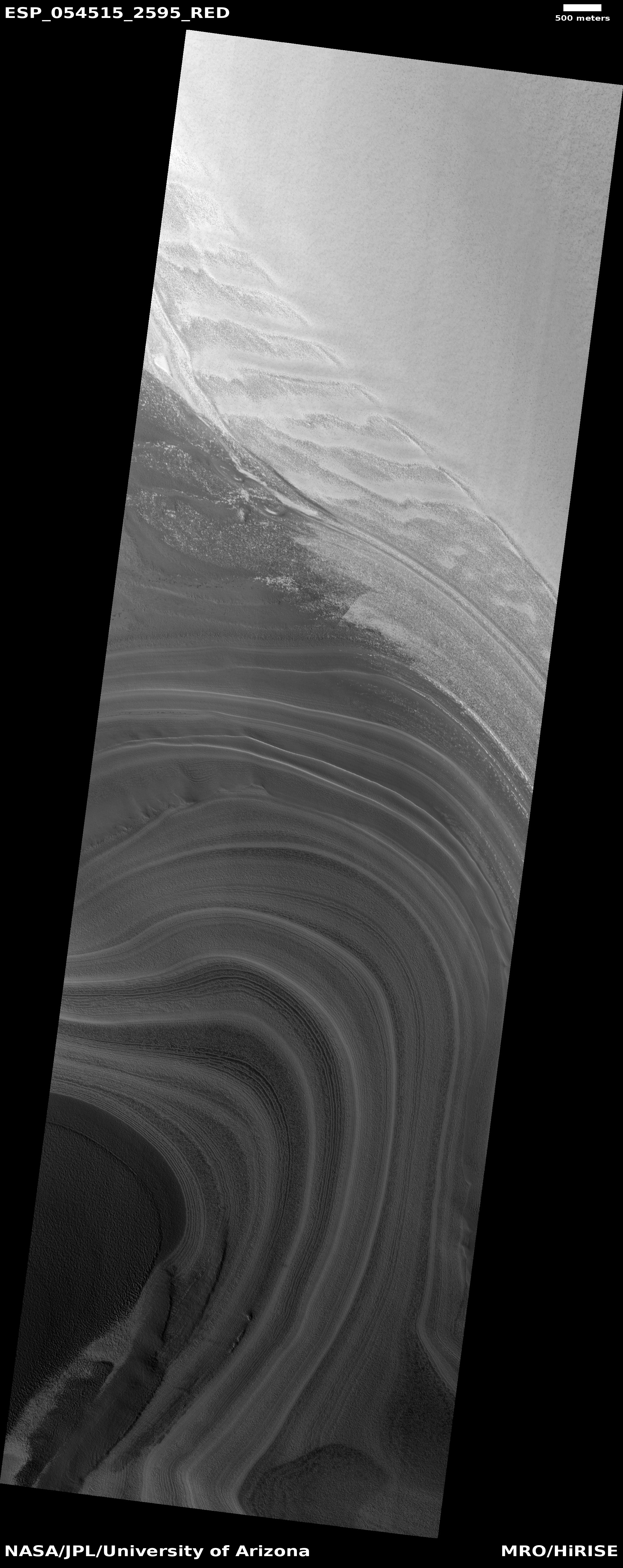
Layers exposed in northern ice cap, as seen by HiRISE under HiWish program

From observations with the Shallow Radar instrument (SHARAD) onboard the Mars Reconnaissance Orbiter, researchers determined that the total volume of water ice in the northern ice cap is 821,000 cubic kilometers (197,000 cu mi). That is equal to 30% of the Earth's Greenland ice sheet, or enough to cover the surface of Mars to a depth of 5.6 meters

== Dunes ==
Sand dunes have been found in many places on Mars. The presence of dunes shows that the planet has an atmosphere with wind, for dunes require wind to pile up the sand. Most dunes on Mars are black because of the weathering of the volcanic rock basalt. Black sand can be found on Earth on Hawaii and on some tropical South Pacific islands. Sand is common on Mars due to the old age of the surface that has allowed rocks to erode into sand. Dunes on Mars have been observed to move many meters. In this process, sand moves up the windward side and then falls down the leeward side of the dune, thus caused the dune to go toward the leeward side (or slip face). When images are enlarged, some dunes on Mars display ripples on their surfaces. These are caused by sand grains rolling and bouncing up the windward surface of a dune. The bouncing grains tend to land on the windward side of each ripple. The grains do not bounce very high so it does not take much to stop them.

== See also ==
- Climate of Mars
- HiRISE
- Impact crater
- List of quadrangles on Mars
- Patterned ground
- Phoenix spacecraft
- Martian polar ice caps
- Vastitas Borealis
- Water on Mars

MC-01 Mare Boreum (features)
| MC-02 Diacria (features) | | MC-03 Arcadia (features) | MC-04 Acidalium (features) | MC-05 Ismenius Lacus (features) | | MC-06 Casius (features) | MC-07 Cebrenia (features) |
| MC-08 Amazonis (features) | MC-09 Tharsis (features) | MC-10 Lunae Palus (features) | MC-11 Oxia Palus (features) | MC-12 Arabia (features) | MC-13 Syrtis Major (features) | MC-14 Amenthes (features) | MC-15 Elysium (features) |
| MC-16 Memnonia (features) | MC-17 Phoenicis Lacus (features) | MC-18 Coprates (features) | MC-19 Margaritifer Sinus (features) | MC-20 Sinus Sabaeus (features) | MC-21 Iapygia (features) | MC-22 Mare Tyrrhenum (features) | MC-23 Aeolis (features) |
| MC-24 Phaethontis (features) | | MC-25 Thaumasia (features) | MC-26 Argyre (features) | MC-27 Noachis (features) | | MC-28 Hellas (features) | MC-29 Eridania (features) |
MC-30 Mare Australe (features)
