= Planum Boreum =

Planum on Mars

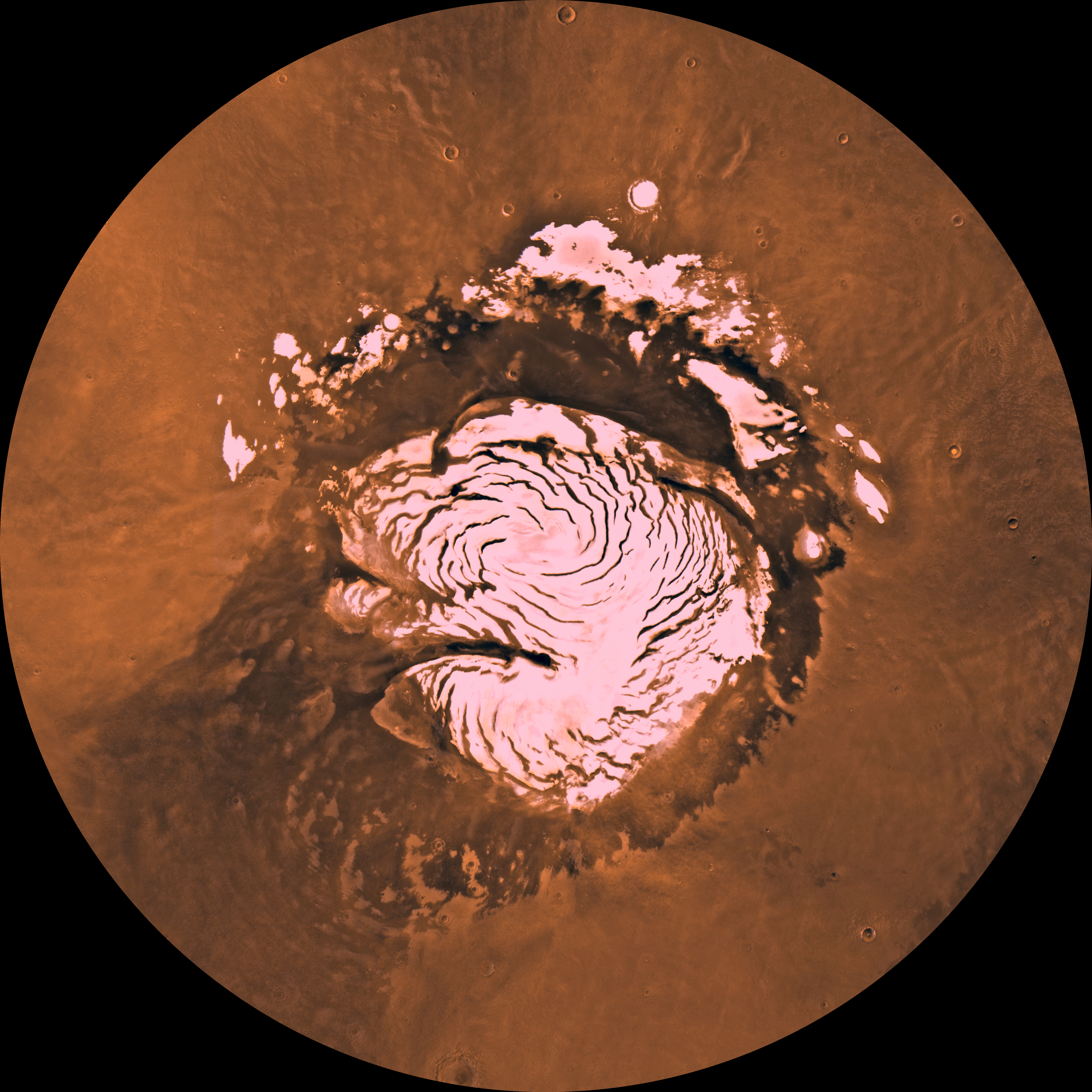
- Viking mosaic of Planum Boreum and surrounds
- Coordinates: 88.0°N 15.0°E

Planum Boreum (Latin: "the northern plain") is the northern polar plain on Mars. It extends northward from roughly 80°N and is centered at 88.0°N 15.0°E. Surrounding the high polar plain is a flat and featureless lowland plain called Vastitas Borealis which extends for approximately 1500 kilometers southwards, dominating the northern hemisphere.

== Features ==
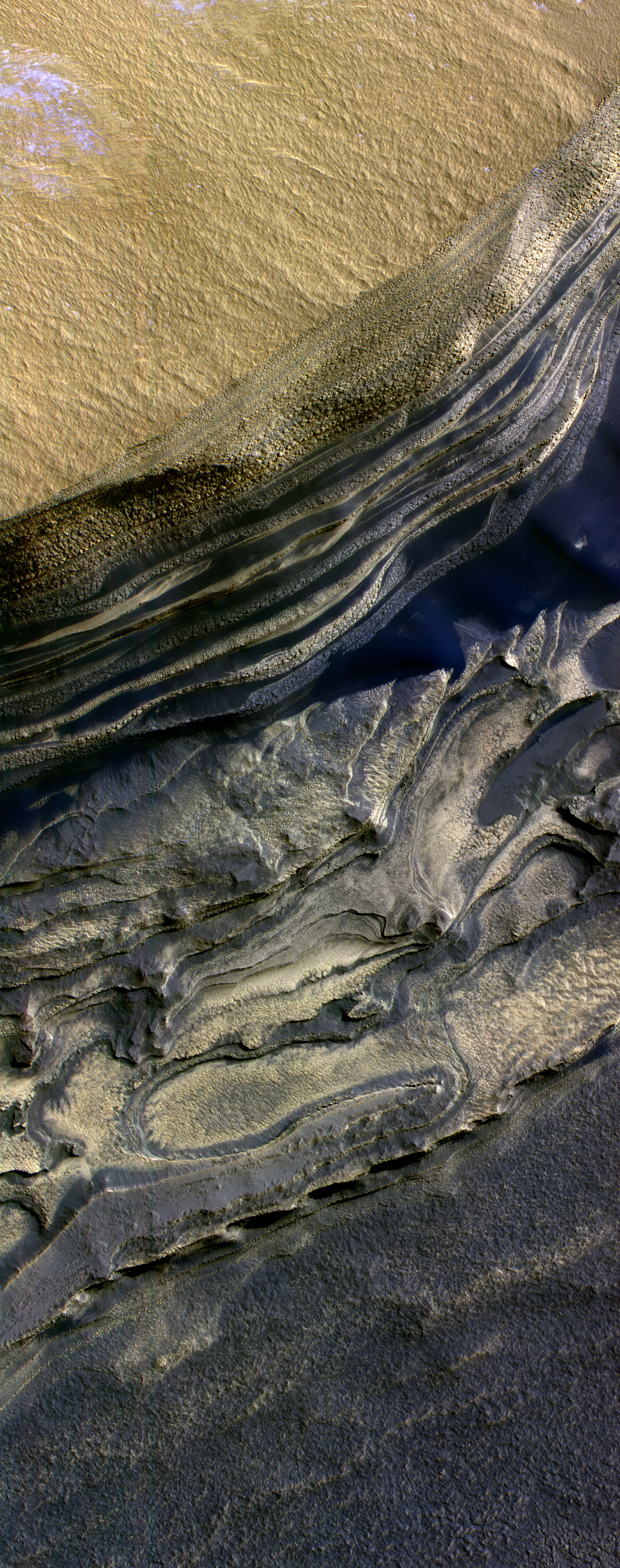
False color HiRISE image of a side of the Chasma Boreale, a canyon in the polar ice cap. Light browns are layers of surface dust greys and blues are layers of water and carbon dioxide ice. Regular geometric cracking is indicative of higher concentrations of water ice.

The main feature of the Planum Boreum is a large fissure or canyon in the polar ice cap called Chasma Boreale. It is up to 100 kilometres (62 mi) wide and features scarps up to 2 kilometres (1.2 mi) high. By comparison, the Grand Canyon is approximately 1.6 kilometres (1 mi) deep in some places and 446 kilometres (277 mi) long but only up to 24 kilometres (15 mi) wide. Chasma Boreale cuts through polar deposits and ice, such as those present at Greenland.

Planum Boreum interfaces with Vastitas Borealis west of Chasma Boreale at an irregular scarp named Rupes Tenuis. This scarp reaches heights of up to 1 km. At other places, the interface is a collection of mesas and troughs.

Planum Boreum is surrounded by large fields of sand dunes spanning from 75°N to 85°N. These dune fields are named Olympia Undae, Abalos Undae, Siton Undae, and Hyperboreae Undae. Olympia Undae, by far the largest, covers from 100°E to 240°E. Abalos Undae covers from 261°E to 280°E and Hyperboreale Undae spans from 311°E to 341°E. See also List of extraterrestrial dune fields.

The North Polar Layered Deposits (NPLD) are a kilometer-thick part of Mars's north polar ice cap. They are mostly water ice (about 95%) mixed with layers of dust. They form a geological record of Mars's climate over millions of years. Layers form because the climate has gone through many cycles of atmospheric ice and dust deposition.

=== Ice cap ===
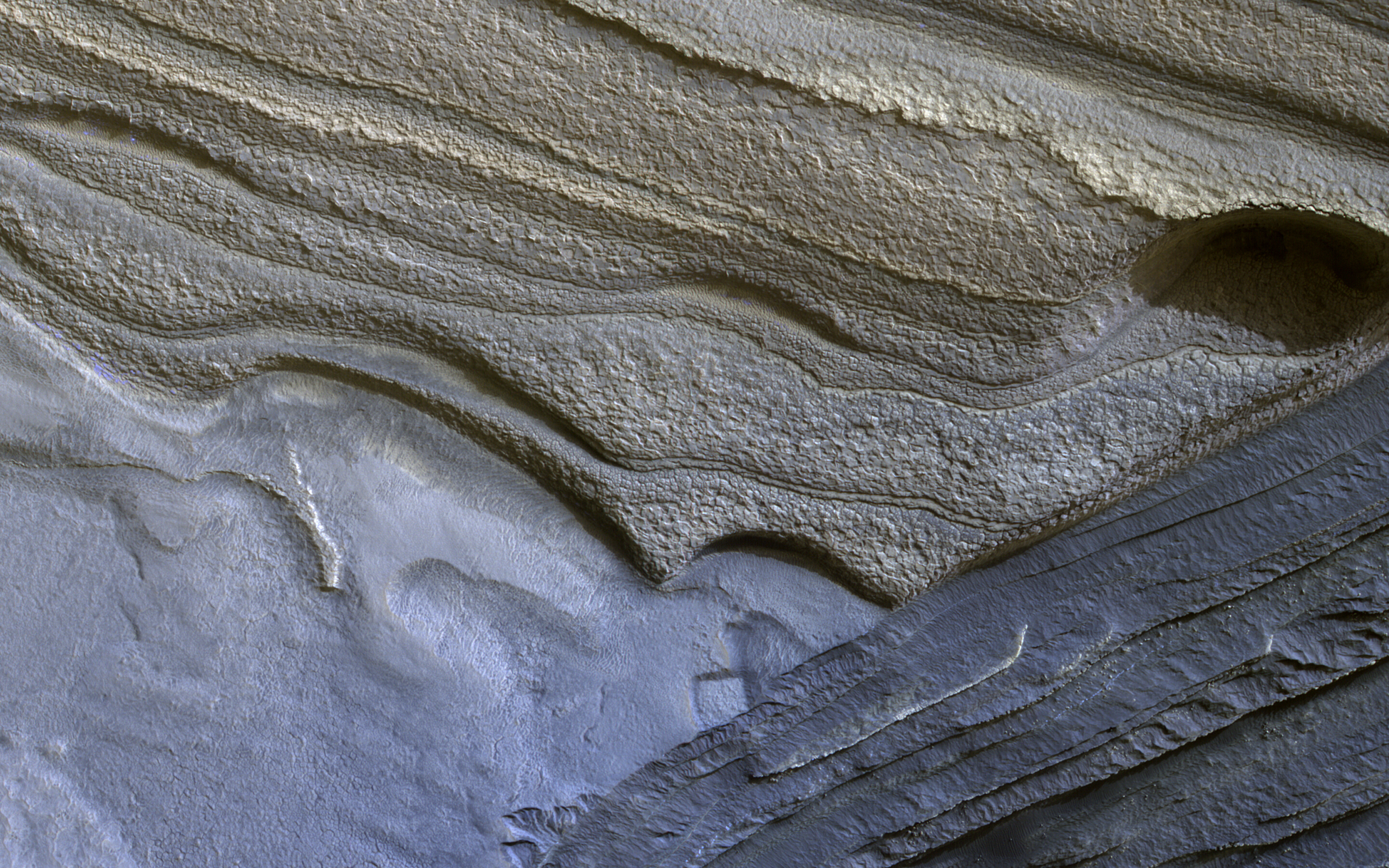
False color HiRISE view of water ice layers in Olympia Rupes, believed by scientists to be preserving climate conditions of Mars dating back millions of years. Depicted width: 1.3 km (3/4 mi)

Planum Boreum is home to a permanent ice cap consisting mainly of water ice (with a 1 m thick veneer of carbon dioxide ice during the winter). It has a volume of 1.2 million cubic kilometres and covers an area equivalent to about 1.5 times the size of Texas. It has a radius of 600 km. The maximum depth of the cap is 3 km.

The spiral troughs in the ice cap are formed by katabatic winds that entrain surface ice eroded from the equator-facing sides of the troughs, likely aided by solar ablation (sublimation), which is then redeposited on the colder pole-facing slopes. The troughs are roughly perpendicular to the wind direction, which is shifted by the Coriolis effect, leading to the spiral pattern. The troughs gradually migrate towards the pole over time; the central troughs have moved about 65 km in the last 2 million years. Chasma Boreale is a canyon-like feature older than the troughs, and in contrast is aligned parallel to the wind direction.

The surface composition of the northern ice cap in middle spring (after a winter's accumulation of seasonal dry ice) has been studied from orbit. The outer edges of the ice cap are contaminated with dust (0.15% by weight) and are mostly water ice. As one moves toward the pole, the surface water ice content decreases and is replaced by dry ice. The purity of the ice also increases. At the pole, the surface seasonal ice consists of essentially pure dry ice with little dust content and 30 parts per million of water ice.

The Phoenix lander, launched in 2007, arrived at Mars in May 2008 and successfully landed in the Vastitas Borealis region of the planet on May 25, 2008. The north polar cap of Mars has been proposed as a landing site for a human Mars expedition by Geoffrey A. Landis and by Charles Cockell.

== Recurring phenomena ==
=== Avalanches ===
A February 2008 HiRISE observation captured four avalanches in progress off a 700 metres (2,300 ft) cliff. The cloud of fine material is 180 metres (590 ft) across and extends 190 metres (620 ft) from the base of the cliff. The reddish layers are known to be rock rich in water ice while the white layers are seasonal carbon dioxide frost. The landslide is thought to have originated from the uppermost red layer. Follow-up observations are planned to characterize the nature of the landslide debris.

Avalanches on Mars

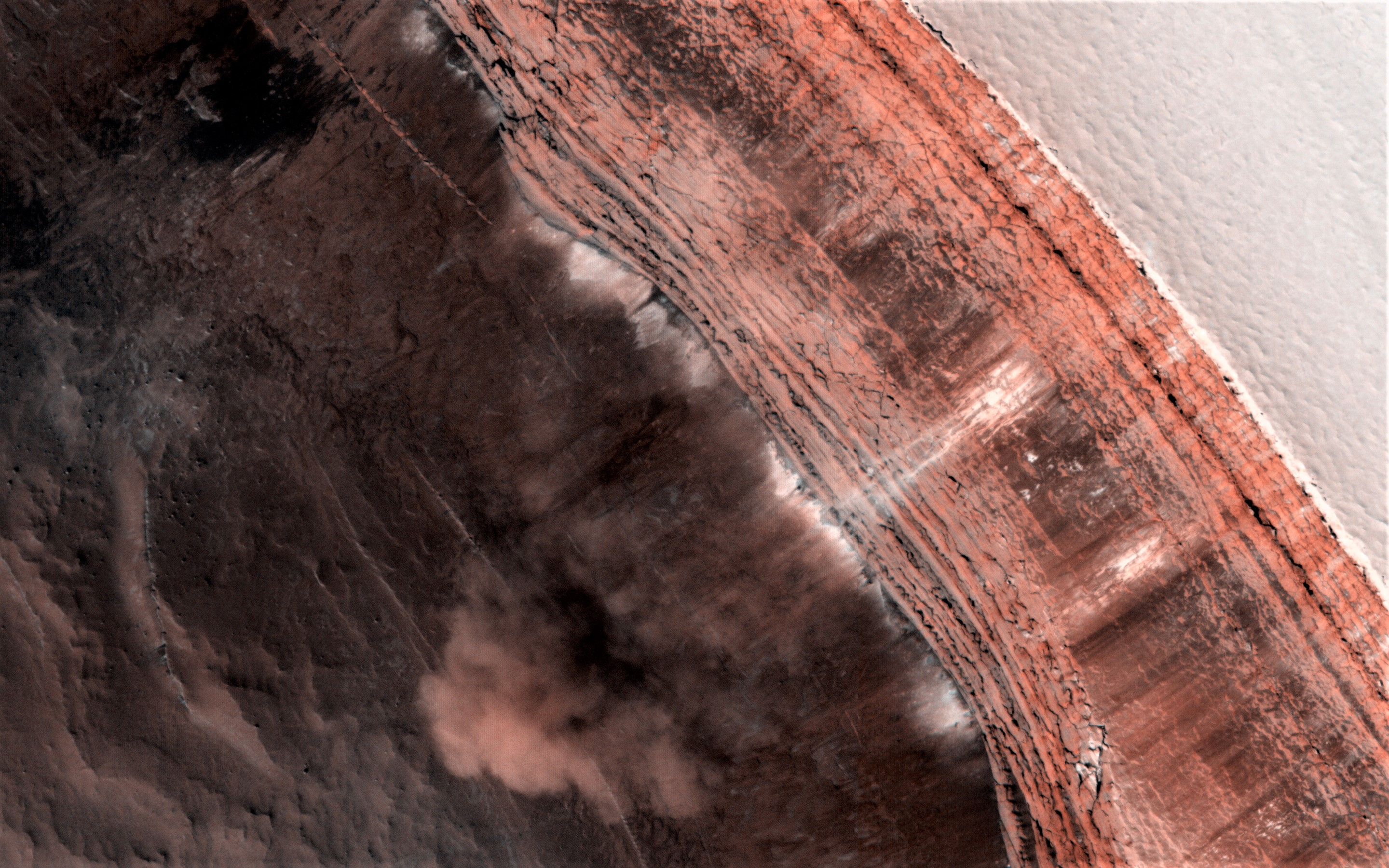
November 27, 2011

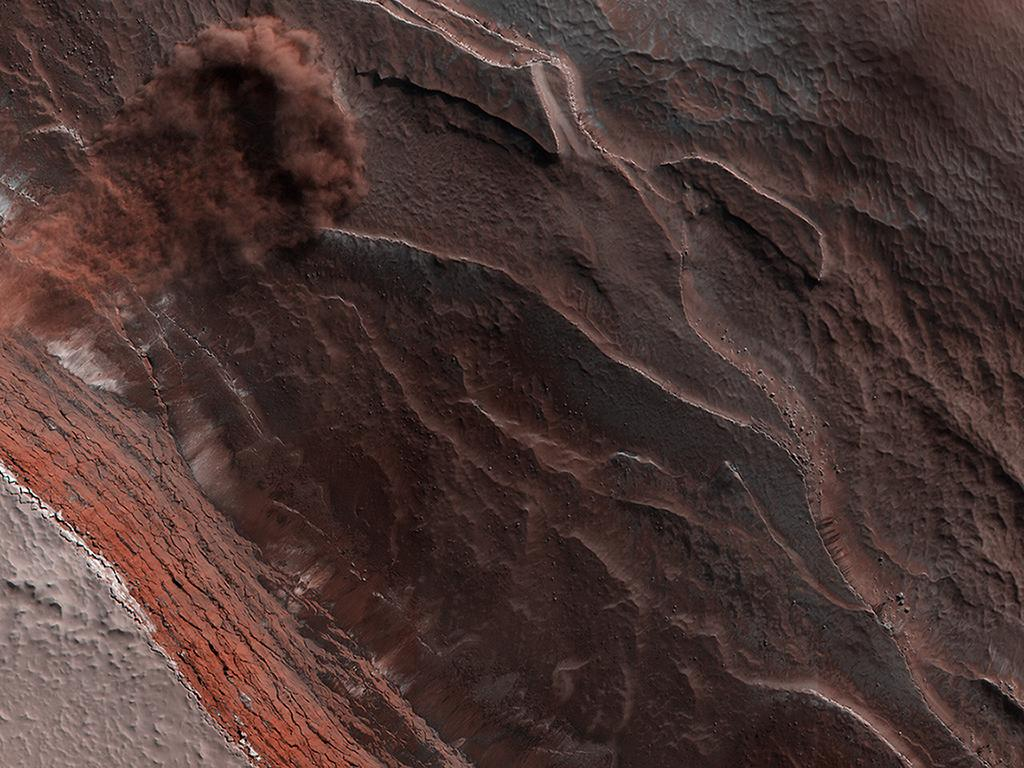
May 29, 2019

=== Repeating annular cloud ===
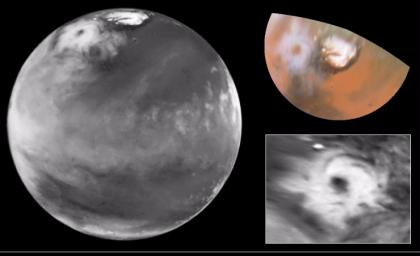
Hubble view of the colossal polar cloud on Mars

A large doughnut-shaped cloud appears in North polar region of Mars around the same time every Martian year and of about the same size. It forms in the morning, dissipates by the Martian afternoon. The outer diameter of the cloud is roughly 1,600 km (1,000 mi), and the inner hole or eye is 320 km (200 mi) across. The cloud is thought to be composed of water-ice, so it is white in color, unlike the more common dust storms.

It looks like a cyclonic storm, similar to hurricane, but it does not rotate. The cloud appears during the northern summer and at high latitude. Speculation is that this is due to unique climate conditions near the northern pole. Cyclone-like storms were first detected during the Viking orbital mapping program, but the northern annular cloud is nearly three times larger. The cloud has also been detected by various probes and telescopes including the Hubble and Mars Global Surveyor.

When Hubble Space Telescope viewed it in 1999, it was thought to be a cyclonic storm. The diameter was measured to be approximately 1750 km, and featured an "eye" 320 km in diameter.

== See also ==
- Abalos Mensa
- Aspledon Undae
- Martian polar ice caps
- Planum Australe, the south polar plain
