= Chasma Boreale =

Canyon on Mars

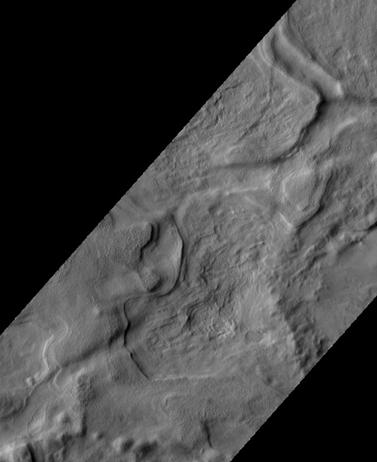
- Chasma Boreale Channels, as seen by HiRISE.
- Coordinates: 83°N 47.1°W

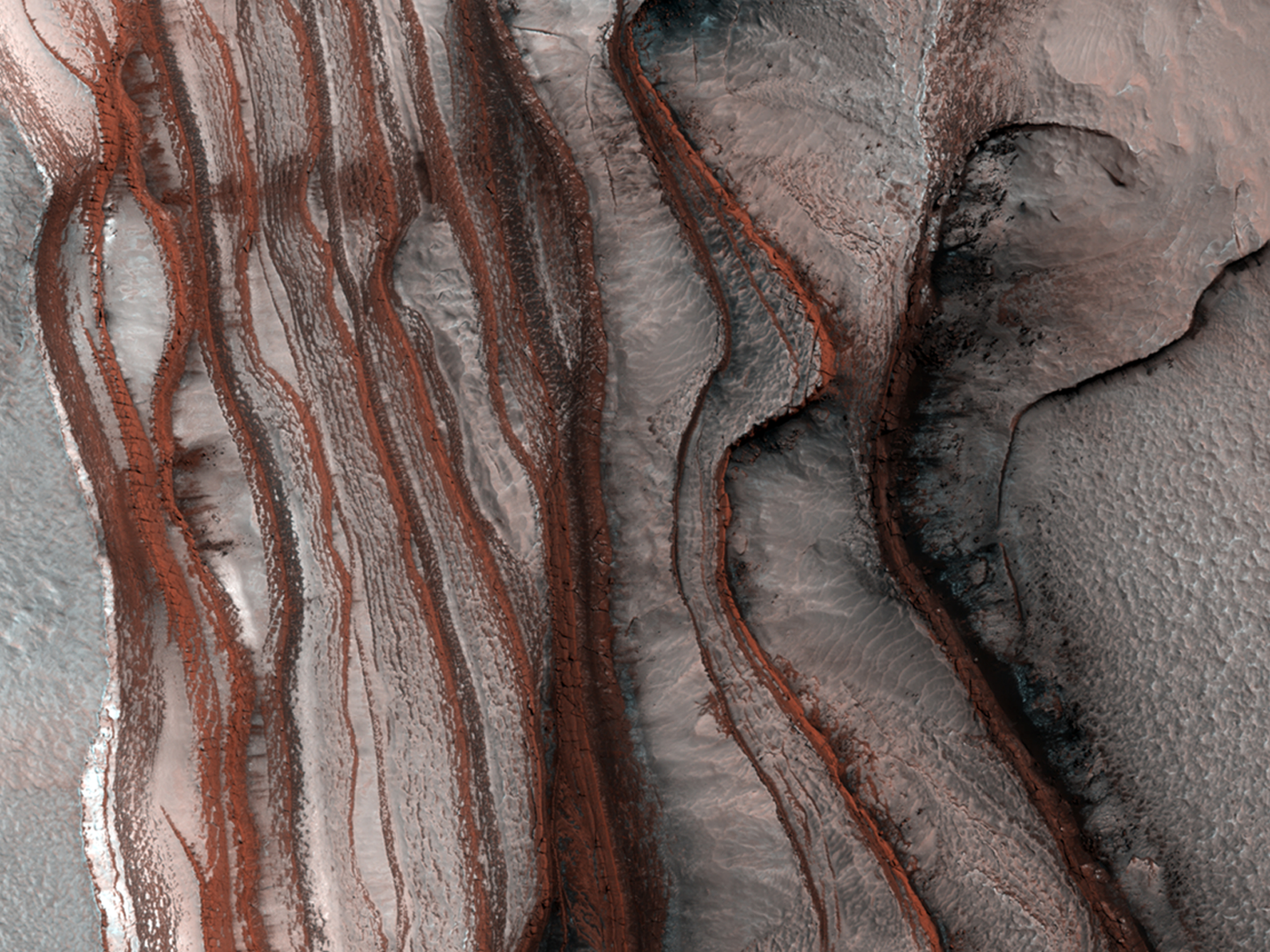
Red Cliffs of Mars, at the Chasma Boreale. 2008 photo by HiRISE.

Chasma Boreale is a large canyon in Mars's north polar ice cap in the Mare Boreum quadrangle of Mars at 83° north latitude and 47.1° west longitude. It is about 560 km (350 mi) long and was named after a classical albedo feature name. The canyon's sides reveal layered features within the ice cap that result from seasonal melting and deposition of ice, together with dust deposits from Martian dust storms. Information about the past climate of Mars may eventually be revealed in these layers, just as tree ring patterns and ice core data do on Earth. Both polar caps also display grooved features, probably caused by wind flow patterns. The grooves are also influenced by the amount of dust. The more dust, the darker the surface. The darker the surface, the more melting as dark surfaces absorb more energy.

== Gallery ==
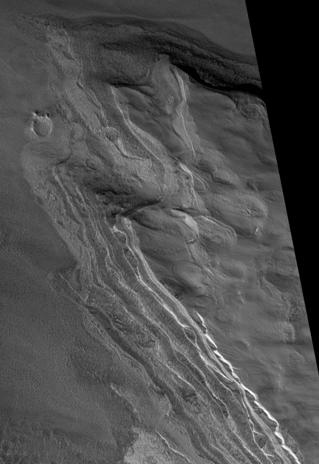
Chasma Boreale streamined feature, as seen by HiRISE.

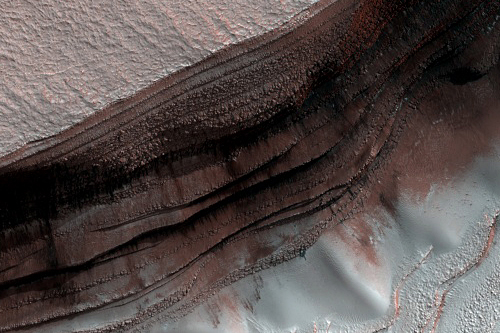
Chasma Boreale, as seen by HiRISE.

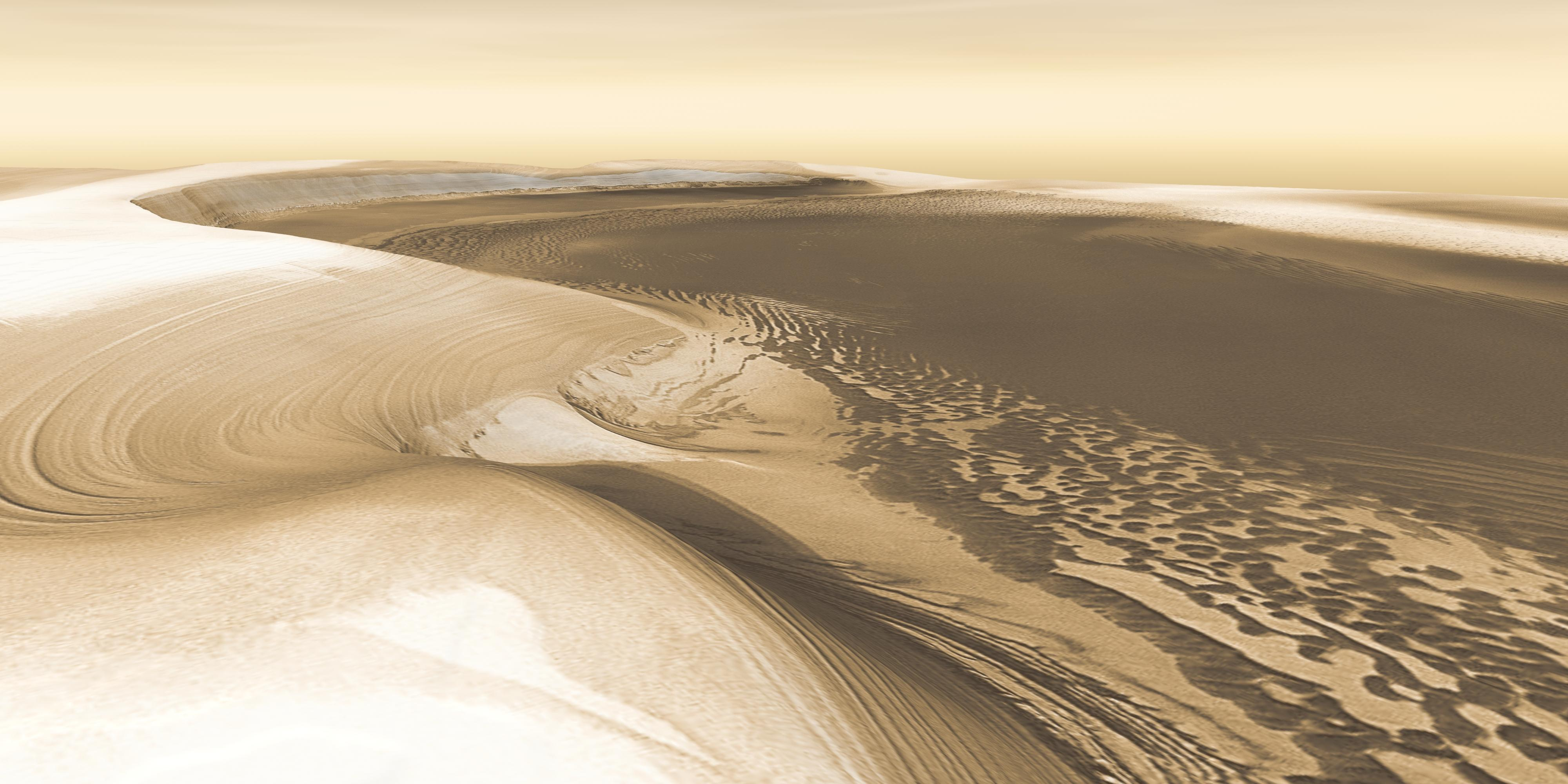
Computer-generated view based on images of Chasma Boreale captured by the THEMIS instrument on Mars Odyssey.
