= Martian polar ice caps =

Water ice deposits on the poles of Mars

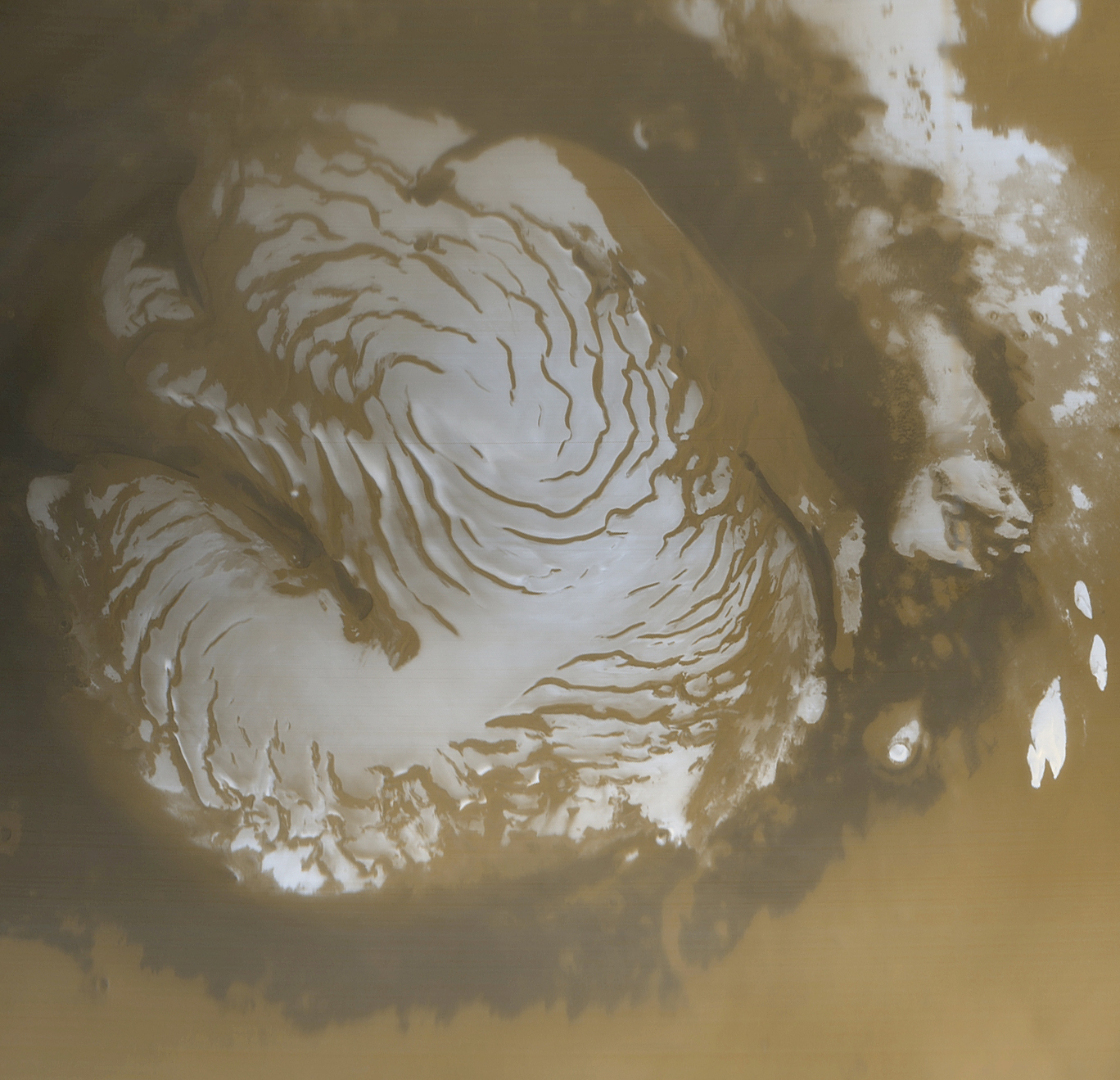
North polar cap in 1999

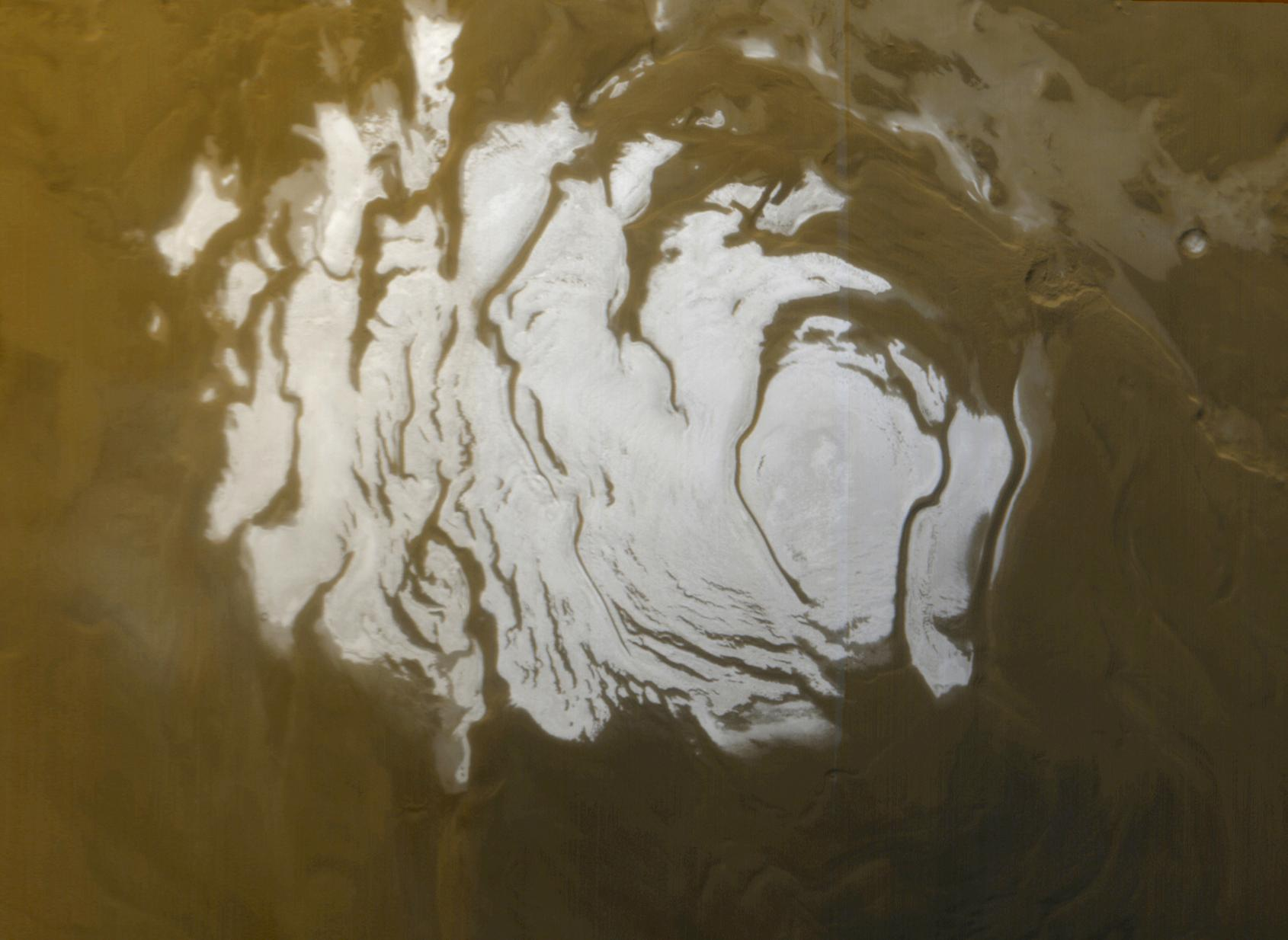
South polar cap in 2000

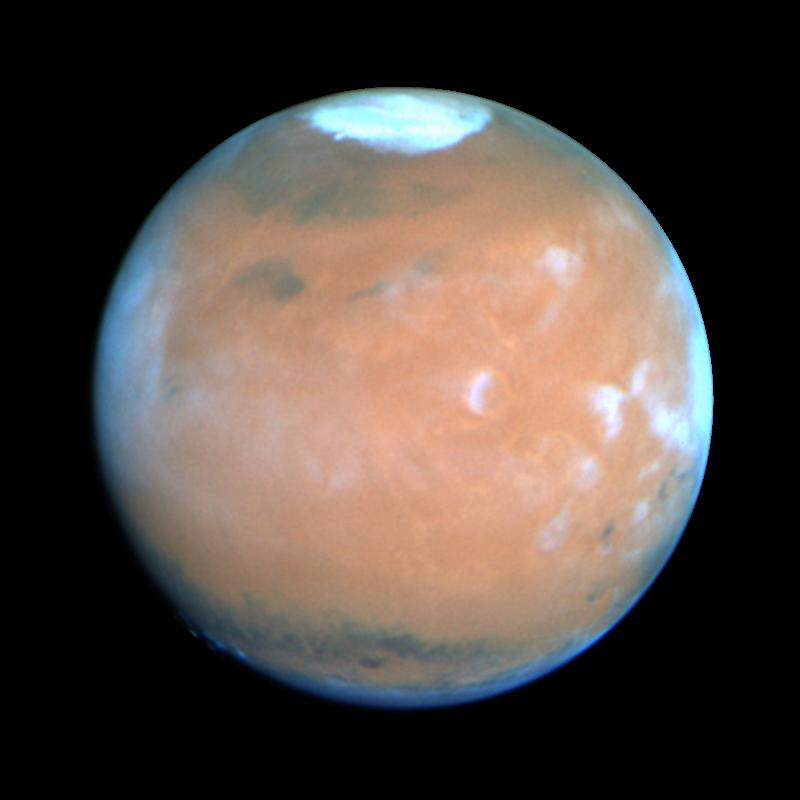
1995 photo of Mars showing approximate size of the polar caps

The planet Mars has two permanent polar ice caps of water ice and some dry ice (frozen carbon dioxide, CO_{2}). Above kilometer-thick layers of water ice permafrost, slabs of dry ice are deposited during a pole's winter, lying in continuous darkness, causing 25–30% of the atmosphere being deposited annually at either of the poles. When the poles are again exposed to sunlight, the frozen CO_{2} sublimes. These seasonal actions transport large amounts of dust and water vapor, giving rise to Earth-like frost and large cirrus clouds.

The caps at both poles consist primarily of water ice. Frozen carbon dioxide accumulates as a comparatively thin layer about one meter thick on the north cap in the northern winter, while the south cap has a permanent dry ice cover about 8 m thick. The northern polar cap has a diameter of about 1000 km during the northern Mars summer, and contains about 1.6 million cubic km of ice, which if spread evenly on the cap would be 2 km thick. (This compares to a volume of 2.85 million cubic km (km^{3}) for the Greenland ice sheet.) The southern polar cap has a diameter of 350 km and a thickness of 3 km. The total volume of ice in the south polar cap plus the adjacent layered deposits has also been estimated at 1.6 million cubic km. Both polar caps show spiral troughs, which analysis of SHARAD ice penetrating radar has shown are a result of roughly perpendicular katabatic winds that spiral due to the Coriolis Effect.

The seasonal frosting of some areas near the southern ice cap results in the formation of transparent 1 m thick slabs of dry ice above the ground. With the arrival of spring, sunlight warms the subsurface and pressure from subliming CO_{2} builds up under a slab, elevating and ultimately rupturing it. This leads to geyser-like eruptions of CO_{2} gas mixed with dark basaltic sand or dust. This process is rapid, observed happening in the space of a few days, weeks or months, a rate of change rather unusual in geology—especially for Mars. The gas rushing underneath a slab to the site of a geyser carves a spider-like pattern of radial channels under the ice.

In 2018, Italian scientists reported that measurements of radar reflections may show a subglacial lake on Mars, 1.5 km (0.93 mi) below the surface of the southern polar layered deposits (not under the visible permanent ice cap), and about 20 km (12 mi) across; If confirmed, this would be the first known stable body of water on the planet. However, similar radar reflections are widespread across the pole, and may be indicative of solid minerals, radar interference, or saline ice instead of liquid water.

== Shared features ==
=== Freezing of atmosphere ===
Research based on slight changes in the orbits of spacecraft around Mars over 16 years found that each winter, approximately 3 trillion to 4 trillion tons of carbon dioxide freezes out of the atmosphere onto the winter hemisphere polar cap. This represents 12 to 16 percent of the mass of the entire Martian atmosphere. These observations support predictions from the Mars Global Reference Atmospheric Model—2010.

=== Layers ===
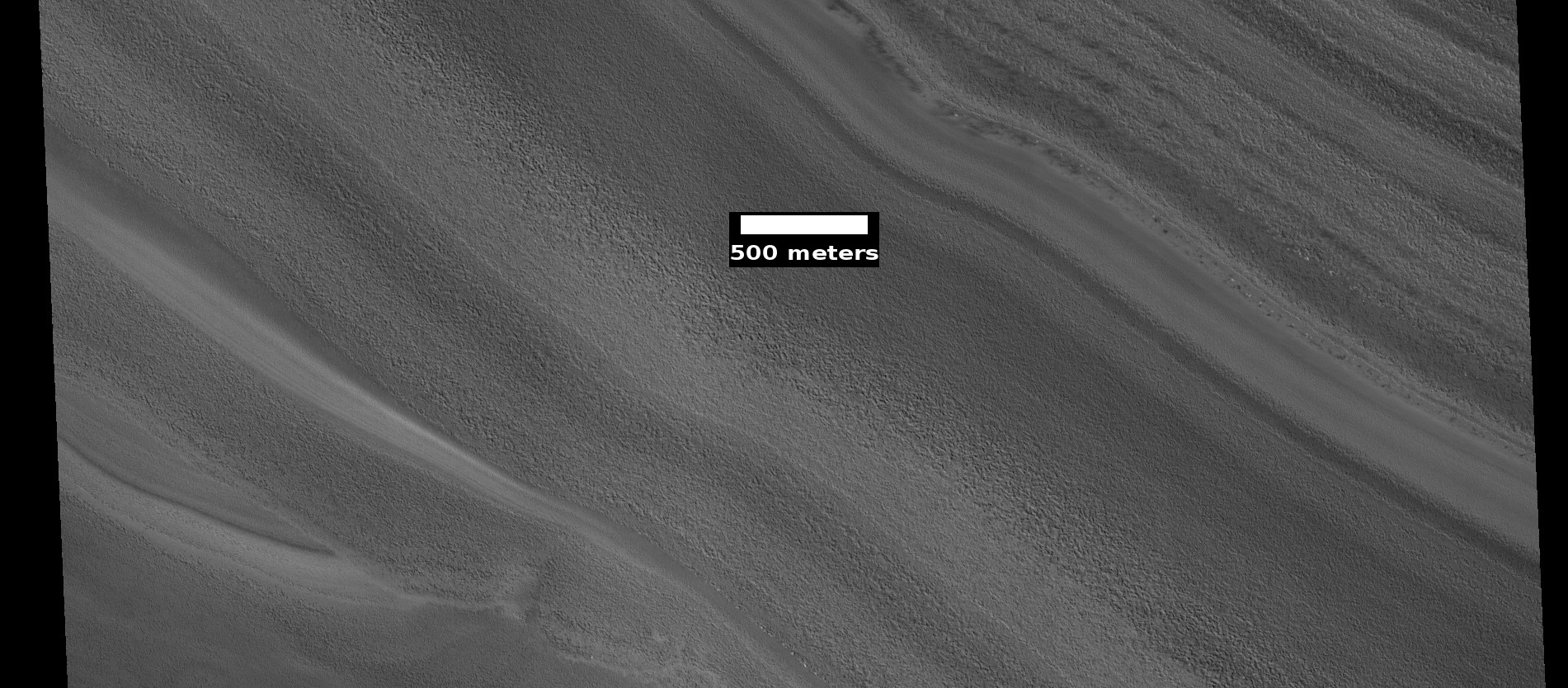
Layers in far north of the north polar ice cap, as seen by HIRISE under the HiWish program

Both polar caps show layered features, called polar-layered deposits, that are thought to have formed over a series of ice ages. Information about the past climate of Mars may be eventually revealed in these layers, just as tree ring patterns and ice core data do on Earth. Both polar caps also display grooved features, probably caused by wind flow patterns. The grooves are also influenced by the amount of dust. The more dust, the darker the surface. The darker the surface, the more sublimation. There are other theories that attempt to explain the large grooves.

China's Zhurong rover that has studied the Utopia Planitia region of Mars has found dunes that lie in different directions. The bright barchans and dark longitudinal dunes is evidence that the predominant wind field underwent a roughly 70° change. The researchers believe the dunes were formed when the tilt changed and caused a shift in the winds. At about the same time, there are changes in the layers in the Martian northern ice caps.

=== Deuterium enrichment ===
Deuterium is a heavier isotope of hydrogen compared to the element's most common isotope, protium. This makes any celestial body's deuterium statistically much less prone to being carried into space by stellar wind compared to its protium. Evidence that Mars once had enough water to create a global ocean at least 137 m deep has been obtained from measurement of the HDO to H_{2}O ratio over the north polar cap. In March 2015, a team of scientists published results showing that the polar cap ice is about eight times as enriched with deuterium as water in Earth's oceans. This means that Mars has lost a volume of water 6.5 times as large as that stored in today's polar caps. The water for a time may have formed an ocean in the low-lying Vastitas Borealis and adjacent lowlands (Acidalia, Arcadia and Utopia planitiae). Had the water ever all been liquid and on the surface, it would have covered 20% of the planet and in places would have been almost a mile deep.

This international team used ESO's Very Large Telescope, along with instruments at the W. M. Keck Observatory and the NASA Infrared Telescope Facility, to map out different isotopic forms of water in Mars's atmosphere over a six-year period.

== North polar cap ==
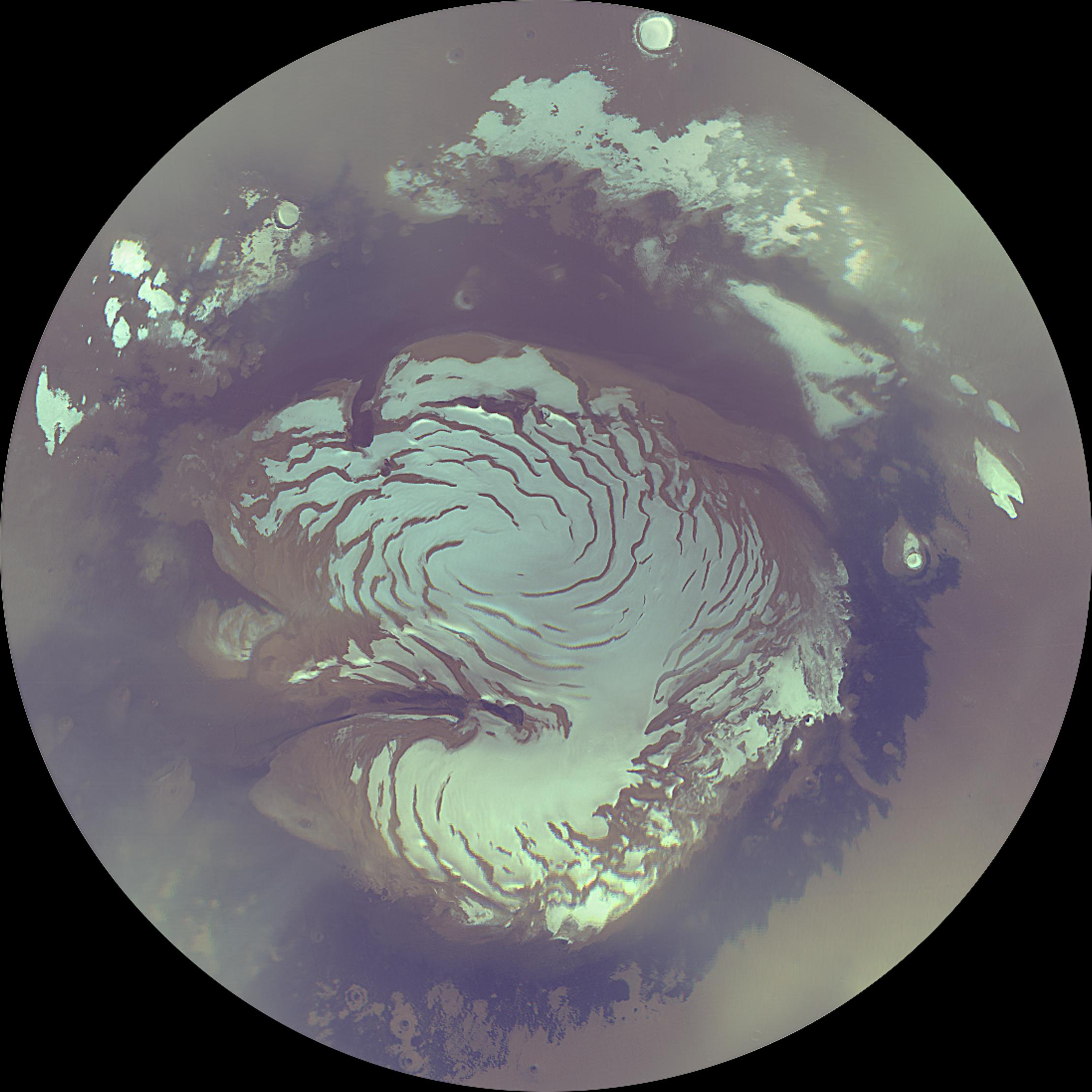
Composite image of the north polar cap in 2006. The dark ring surrounding the polar cap is sand dunes.

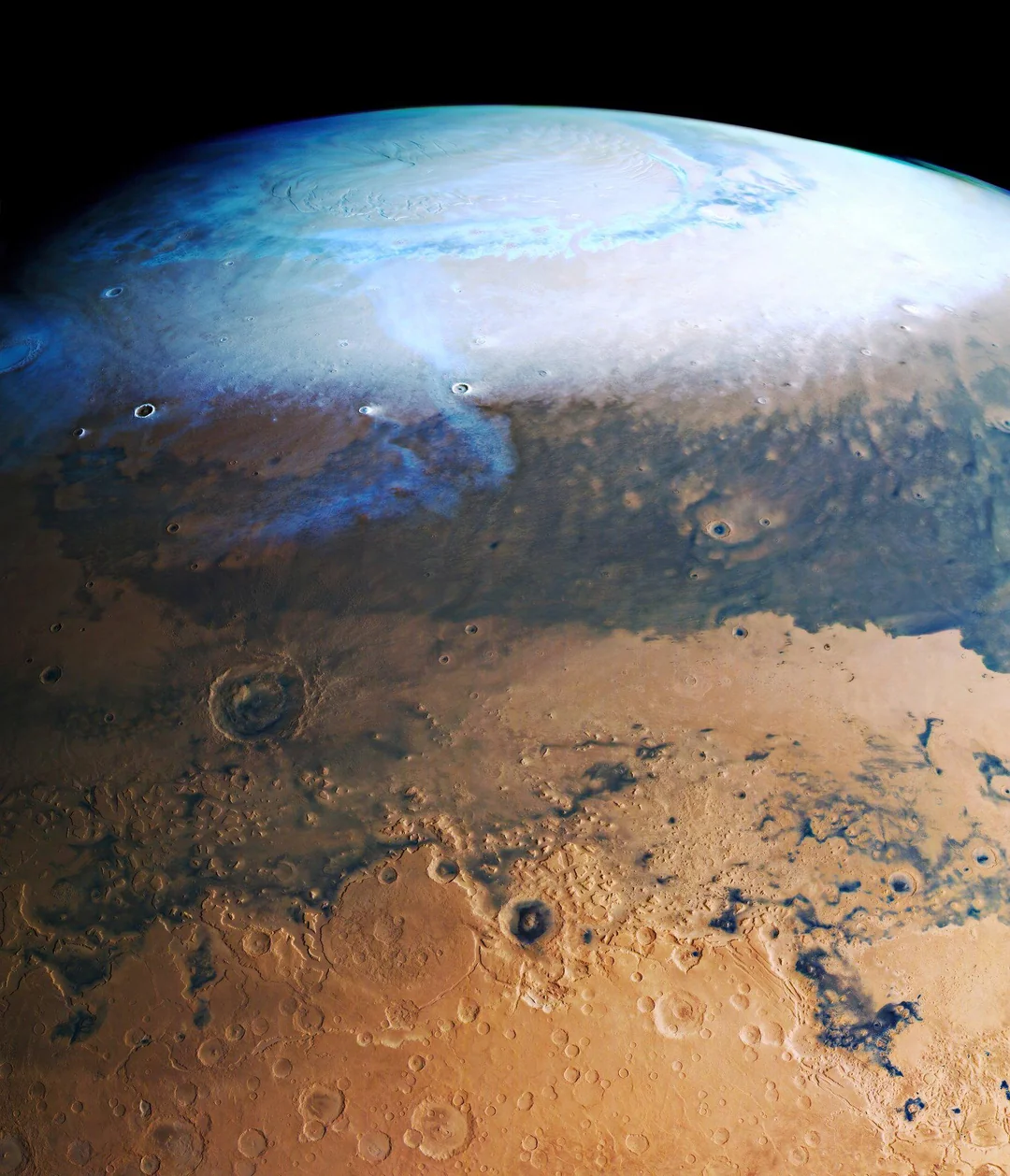
Mars Express view of water ice caps of North pole during its winter

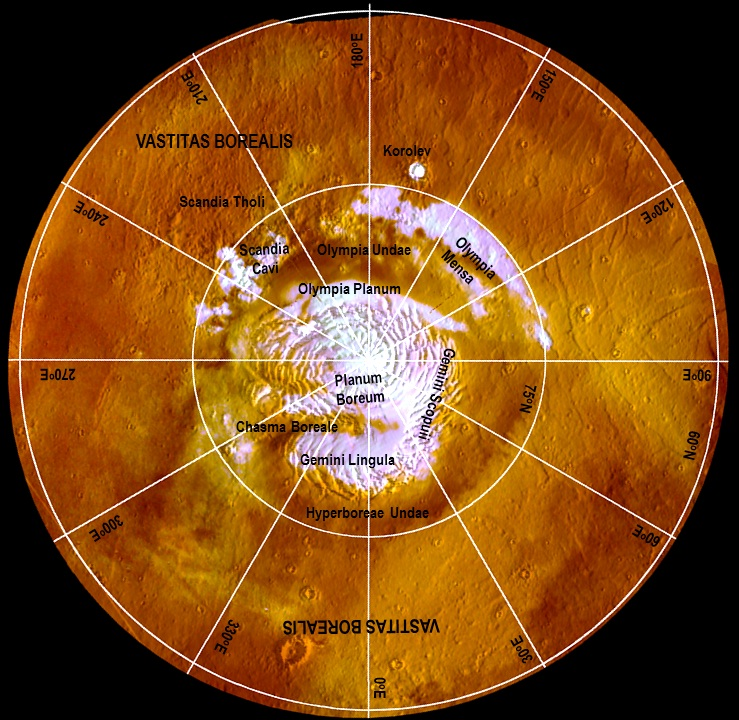
Mosaic of images taken between 16 December 2015 and 26 January 2016 by Mars Orbiter Mission

The bulk of the northern ice cap consists of water ice; it also has a thin seasonal veneer of dry ice, solid carbon dioxide. Each winter the ice cap grows by adding 1.5 to 2 m of dry ice. In summer, the dry ice sublimates (goes directly from a solid to a gas) into the atmosphere. Mars has seasons that are similar to Earth's, because its rotational axis has a tilt close to our own Earth's (25.19° for Mars, 23.44° for Earth).

During each year on Mars as much as a third of Mars's thin carbon dioxide (CO_{2}) atmosphere "freezes out" during the winter in the northern and southern hemispheres. Scientists have even measured tiny changes in the gravity field of Mars due to the movement of carbon dioxide.

The ice cap in the north is at a lower elevation (base at −5000 m, top at −2000 m) than the one in the south (base at 1000 m, top at 3500 m). It is also warmer, so all the frozen carbon dioxide disappears each summer. The part of the cap that survives the summer is called the north residual cap and is made of water ice, mixed with < 3% dust by mass. This water ice is believed to be as much as three kilometers thick, and its surface optical properties are similar to coarse-grained firn on Earth. The much thinner seasonal cap starts to form in the late summer to early fall when a variety of clouds form. Called the polar hood, the clouds drop precipitation which thickens the cap. The north polar cap is symmetrical around the pole and covers the surface down to about 60 degrees latitude. High resolution images taken with NASA's Mars Global Surveyor show that the northern polar cap is covered mainly by pits, cracks, small bumps and knobs that give it a cottage cheese look. The pits are spaced close together relative to the very different depressions in the south polar cap.

Both polar caps show layered features that are thought to have formed over a series of ice ages. These polar layered deposits lie under the permanent polar caps. Information about the past climate of Mars may be eventually revealed in these layers, just as tree ring patterns and ice core data do on Earth. Both polar caps also display grooved features, probably caused by wind flow patterns and sun angles, although there are several theories that have been advanced. The grooves are also influenced by the amount of dust. One large valley, Chasma Boreale runs halfway across the cap. It is about 100 km wide and up to 2 km deep—that's deeper than Earth's Grand Canyon.

When the tilt or obliquity changes the size of the polar caps can change. When the tilt is at its highest, the poles receive far more sunlight and for more hours each day. The extra sunlight causes the ice to sublimate, and water vapor to be transported to the mid-latitudes.

Research reported in 2009 shows that the ice rich layers of the ice cap match models for Martian climate swings. NASA's Mars Reconnaissance Orbiter's radar instrument can measure the contrast in electrical properties between layers. The pattern of reflectivity reveals the pattern of material variations within the layers. Radar produced a cross-sectional view of the north-polar layered deposits of Mars. High-reflectivity zones, with multiple contrasting layers, alternate with zones of lower reflectivity. Patterns of how these two types of zones alternate can be correlated to models of changes in the tilt of Mars. Since the top zone of the north-polar layered deposits—the most recently deposited portion—is strongly radar-reflective, the researchers propose that such sections of high-contrast layering correspond to periods of relatively small swings in the planet's tilt because the Martian axis has not varied much recently. Dustier layers appear to be deposited during periods when the atmosphere is dustier.

Research, published in January 2010 using HiRISE images, says that understanding the layers is more complicated than was formerly believed. The brightness of the layers does not just depend on the amount of dust. The angle of the sun together with the angle of the spacecraft greatly affect the brightness seen by the camera. This angle depends on factors such as the shape of the trough wall and its orientation. Furthermore, the roughness of the surface can greatly change the albedo (amount of reflected light). In addition, many times what one is seeing is not a real layer, but a fresh covering of frost. All of these factors are influenced by the wind which can erode surfaces. The HiRISE camera did not reveal layers that were thinner than those seen by the Mars Global Surveyor. However, it did see more detail within layers.

Radar measurements of the north polar ice cap found the volume of water ice in the layered deposits of the cap was 821,000 cubic kilometers (197,000 mi^{3}), which is equal to 30% of the Earth's Greenland ice sheet. (The layered deposits overlie an additional basal deposit of ice.) The radar is on board the Mars Reconnaissance Orbiter.

SHARAD radar data when combined to form a 3D model reveal buried craters. These may be used to date certain layers.

In February 2017, ESA released a new view of Mars's North Pole. It was a mosaic made from 32 individual orbits of the Mars Express.

In a paper published in Nature in 2023, researches found an abrupt brightness increase in the northern ice cap layers that happened at roughly 0.4 million years ago. This change may have caused changes in wind direction that are seen in regions explored by the Zhurong rover.

== South polar cap ==
The south polar permanent cap is much smaller than the one in the north. It is 400 km in diameter, as compared to the 1100 km diameter of the northern cap. Each southern winter, the ice cap covers the surface to a latitude of 50°. Part of the ice cap consists of dry ice, solid carbon dioxide. Each winter the ice cap grows by adding 1.5 to 2 meters of dry ice from precipitation from a polar-hood of clouds. In summer, the dry ice sublimates (goes directly from a solid to a gas) into the atmosphere. During each year on Mars as much as a third of Mars's thin carbon dioxide atmosphere "freezes out" during the winter in the northern and southern hemispheres. Scientists have even measured tiny changes in the gravity field of Mars due to the movement of carbon dioxide. In other words, the winter buildup of ice changes the gravity of the planet. Mars has seasons that are similar to Earth's because its rotational axis has a tilt close to our own Earth's (25.19° for Mars, 23.45° for Earth). The south polar cap is higher in elevation and colder than the one in the north.

The residual southern ice cap is displaced; that is, it is not centered on the south pole. However, the south seasonal cap is centered near the geographic pole. Studies have shown that the off center cap is caused by much more snow falling on one side than the other. On the western hemisphere side of the south pole a low pressure system forms because the winds are changed by the Hellas Basin. This system produces more snow. On the other side, there is less snow and more frost. Snow tends to reflect more sunlight in the summer, so not much melts or sublimates (Mars climate generally causes snow to go directly from a solid to a gas). Frost, on the other hand has a rougher surface and tends to trap more sunlight, resulting in more sublimation. In other words, areas with more of the rougher frost are warmer.

Research published in April 2011, described a large deposit of frozen carbon dioxide near the south pole. Most of this deposit probably enters Mars's atmosphere when the planet's tilt increases. When this occurs, the atmosphere thickens, winds get stronger, and larger areas on the surface can support liquid water. Analysis of data showed that if these deposits were all changed into gas, the atmospheric pressure on Mars would double. There are three layers of these deposits; each is capped with a 30-meter layer of water ice that prevents the CO_{2} from sublimating into the atmosphere. In sublimation a solid material goes directly into a gas phase. These three layers are linked to periods when the atmosphere collapsed when the climate changed.

A large field of eskers exists around the south pole called the Dorsa Argentea Formation. It is believed to be the remains of a giant ice sheet. This large polar ice sheet is believed to have covered about 1.5 million square kilometers. That area is twice the area of the state of Texas.

In July 2018 ESA discovered indications of liquid salt water buried under layers of ice and dust by analyzing the reflection of radar pulses generated by Mars Express.

=== Swiss cheese appearance ===
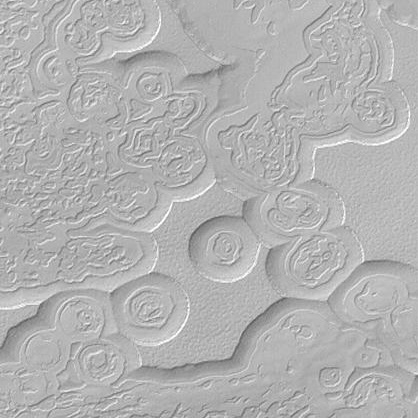
Swiss Cheese terrain on the south polar cap of Mars, as seen by Mars Global Surveyor. Largest mesas ~4 meters (13 feet) high; area of 3 x 3 kilometers (1.9 x 1.9 miles).

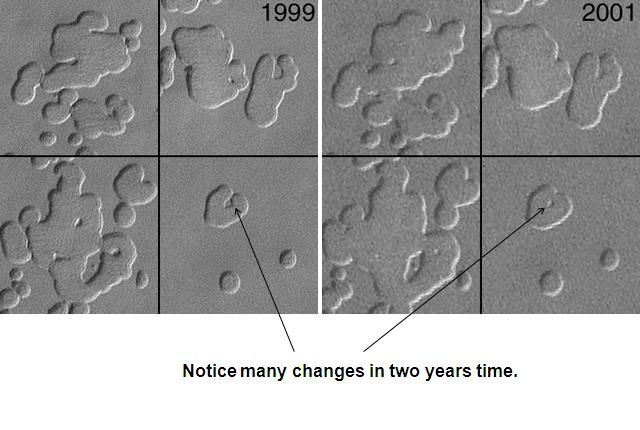
Changes in south polar surface from 1999 to 2001, as seen by Mars Global Surveyor.

While the north polar cap of Mars has a flat, pitted surface resembling cottage cheese, the south polar cap has larger pits, troughs and flat mesas that give it a Swiss cheese appearance. The upper layer of the Martian south polar residual cap has been eroded into flat-topped mesas with circular depressions. Observations made by Mars Orbiter Camera in 2001 have shown that the scarps and pit walls of the south polar cap had retreated at an average rate of about 3 meters (9.8 feet) since 1999. In other words, they were retreating 3 meters per Mars year. In some places on the cap, the scarps retreat less than 3 meters a Mars year, and in others it can retreat as much as 8 meters (26 feet) per Martian year. Over time, south polar pits merge to become plains, mesas turn into buttes, and buttes vanish forever. The round shape is probably aided in its formation by the angle of the sun. In the summer, the sun moves around the sky, sometimes for 24 hours each day, just above the horizon. As a result, the walls of a round depression will receive more intense sunlight than the floor; the wall will melt far more than the floor. The walls melt and recede, while the floor remains the same.

Later research with the powerful HiRISE showed that the pits are in a 1–10 meter thick layer of dry ice that is sitting on a much larger water ice cap. Pits have been observed to begin with small areas along faint fractures. The circular pits have steep walls that work to focus sunlight, thereby increasing erosion. For a pit to develop a steep wall of about 10 cm and a length of over 5 meters in necessary.

The pictures below show why it is said the surface resembles Swiss cheese; one can also observe the differences over a two-year period.

=== Starburst channels or spiders ===
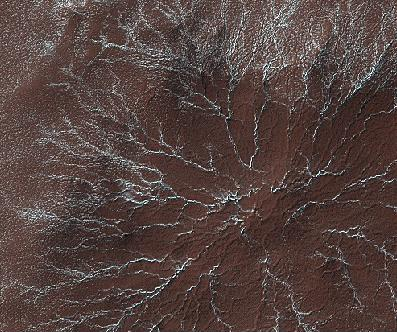
Star burst channels caused by escaping CO2 gas, as seen by HiRISE. Such channels, also called spiders, may be about 500 m in diameter and 1 m deep.

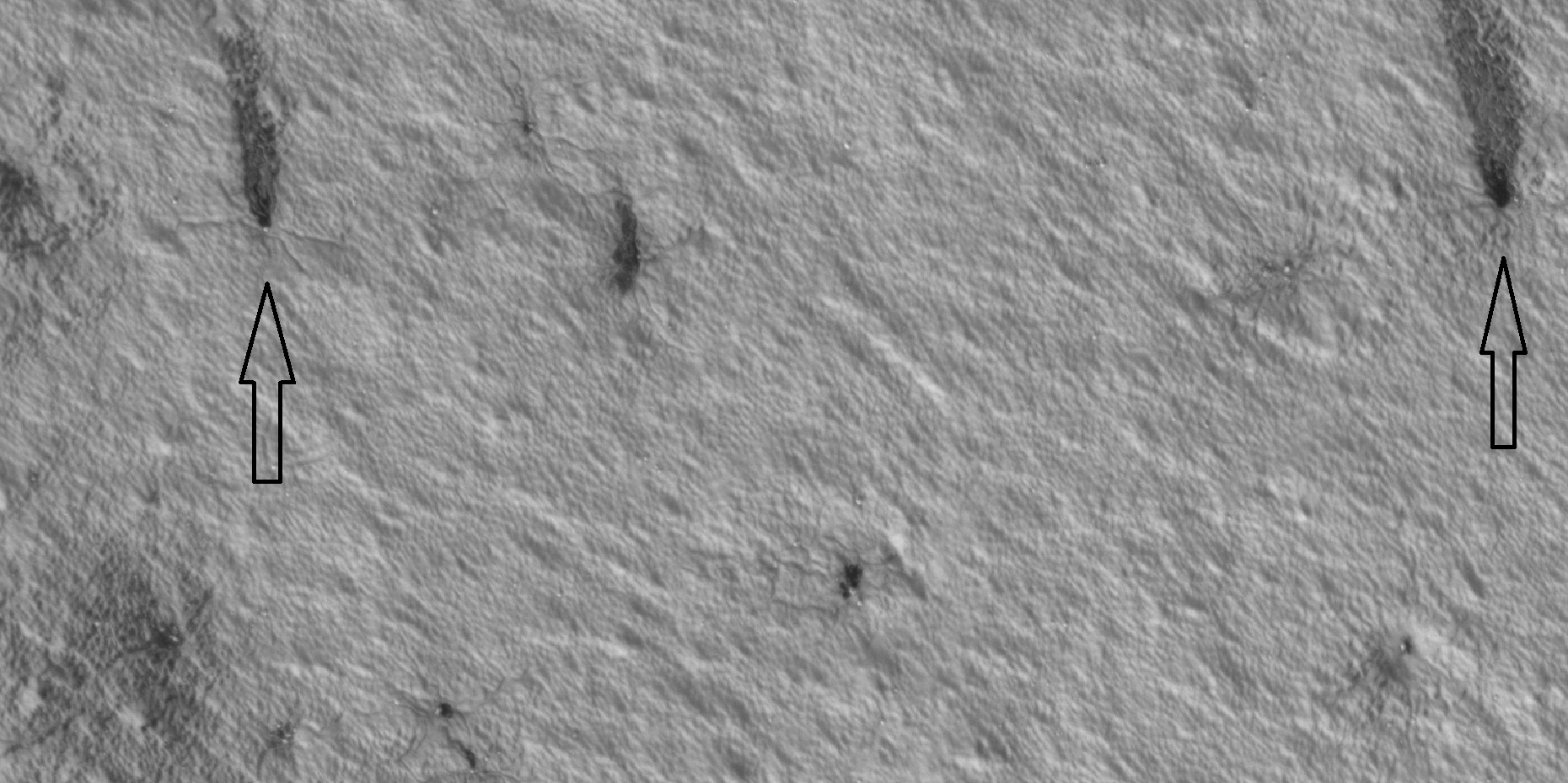
Plumes and spiders, as seen by HiRISE under HiWish program

Starburst channels are patterns of channels that radiate out into feathery extensions. They are caused by gas which escapes along with dust. The gas builds up beneath translucent ice as the temperature warms in the spring. Typically 500 meters wide and 1 meter deep, the spiders may undergo observable changes in just a few days. One model for understanding the formation of the spiders says that sunlight heats dust grains in the ice. The warm dust grains settle by sublimating downward through the ice while the holes are annealed behind them. As a result, the ice becomes fairly clear. Sunlight then reaches the dark bottom of the slab of ice and changes the solid carbon dioxide ice into a gas which flows toward higher regions that open to the surface. The gas rushes out carrying dark dust with it. Winds at the surface will blow the escaping gas and dust into dark fans that we observe with orbiting spacecraft. The physics of this model is similar to ideas put forth to explain dark plumes erupting from the surface of Triton.

Research, published in January 2010 using HiRISE images, found that some of the channels in spiders grow larger as they go uphill since gas is doing the erosion. The researchers also found that the gas flows to a crack that has occurred at a weak point in the ice. As soon as the sun rises above the horizon, gas from the spiders blows out dust which is blown by wind to form a dark fan shape. Some of the dust gets trapped in the channels. Eventually frost covers all the fans and channels until the next spring when the cycle repeats.

=== Layers ===
Chasma Australe, a major valley, cuts across the layered deposits in the South Polar cap. On the 90 E side, the deposits rest on a major basin, called Prometheus.

Some of the layers in the south pole also show polygonal fracturing in the form of rectangles. It is thought that the fractures were caused by the expansion and contraction of water ice below the surface.

== Gallery ==
Extents of north (left) and south (right) polar CO_{2} ice during a Martian year

Ice cap images

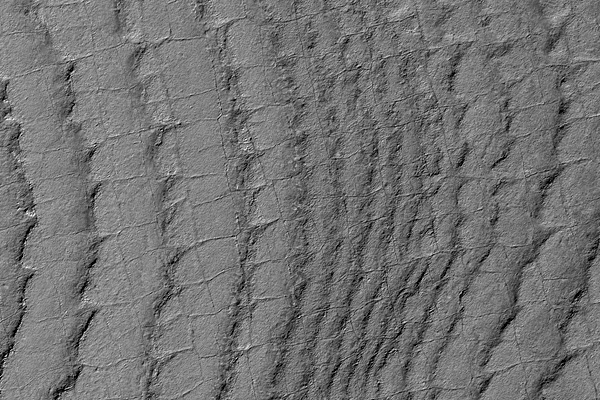
This HiRISE image shows layers running roughly up and down, with faint polygonal fracturing (mostly rectangular).

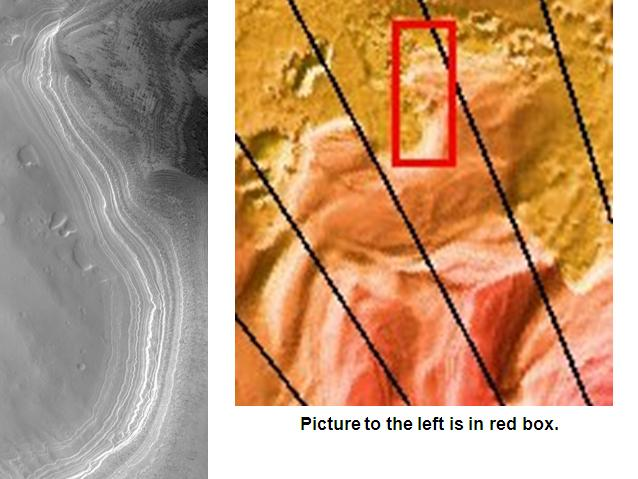
South polar layers, as seen by THEMIS.

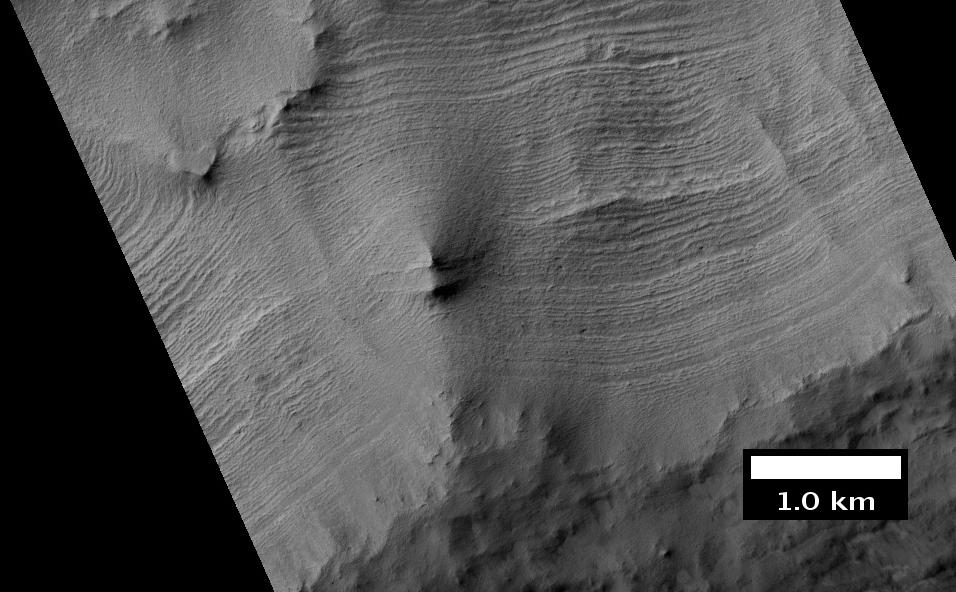
Close-up of layers in wall of McMurdo crater, as seen by HiRISE.

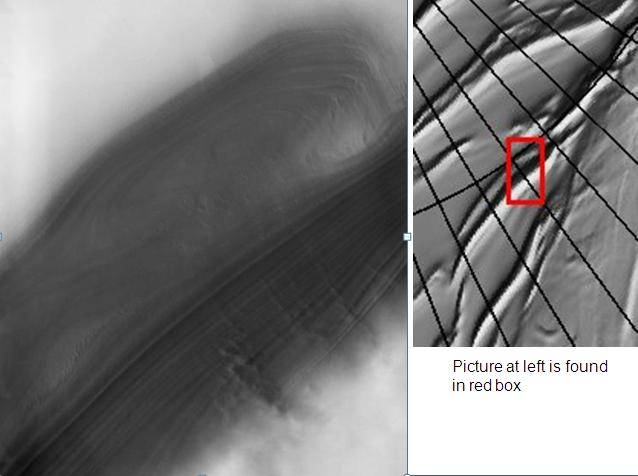
Layers exposed in a valley on the north polar ice cap as observed by Mars Odyssey. Click on image to enlarge to see clouds of dust caused by winds coming off the cap.

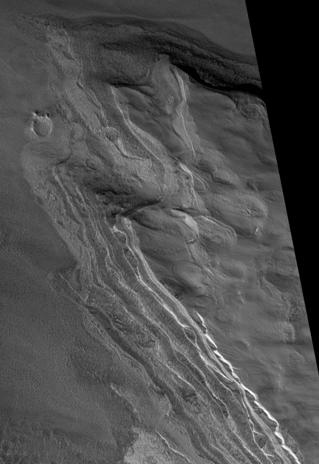
Chasma Boreale streamlined feature, as seen by HiRISE.

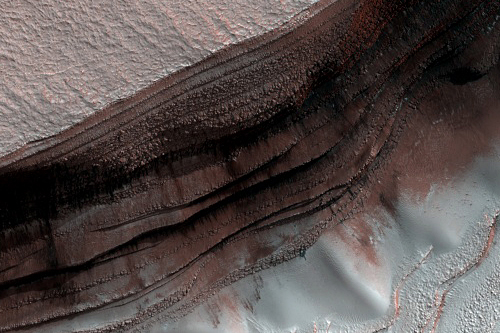
Chasma Boreale, as seen by HiRISE.

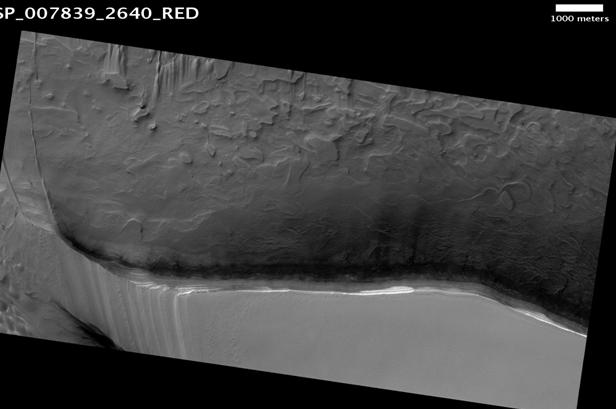
Steep scarp, as seen by HiRISE.

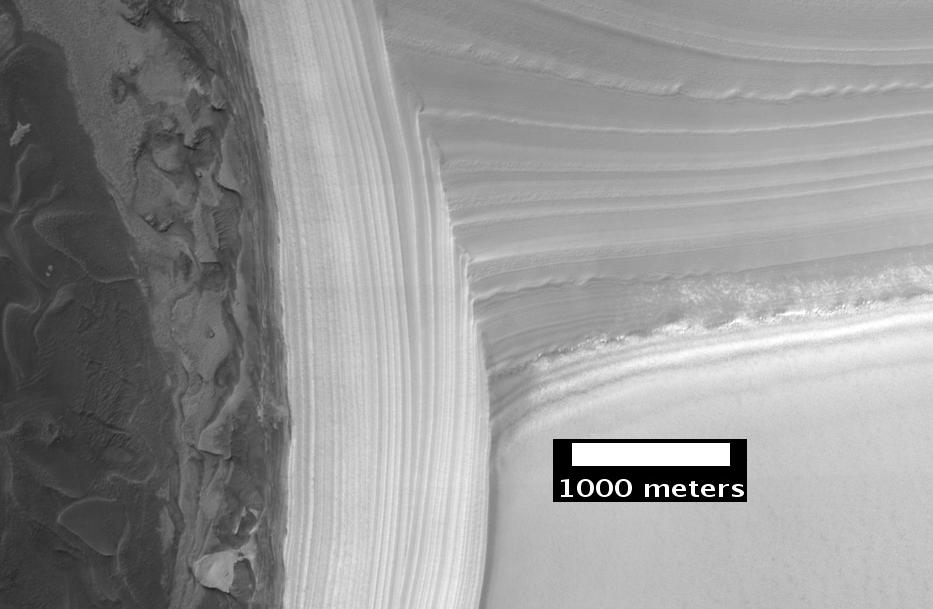
North polar layers on the side of a valley, as seen by HiRISE. Layers erode differently, depending on what direction they face. On one side they are straight, as if cut by a knife.

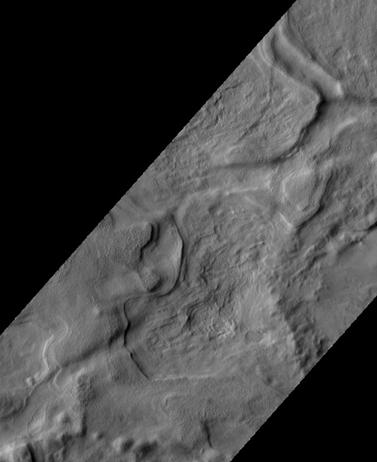
Chasma Boreale channels, as seen by HiRISE.

== See also ==
- Geysers on Mars – Putative CO2 gas and dust eruptions on Mars
- Mare Australe quadrangle – Map of Mars
- Mare Boreum quadrangle – Map of Mars
- Swiss cheese features – Enigmatic surface features on Mars's southern ice cap
- Phoenix (spacecraft) – NASA Mars lander (2008)
- Sublimation – Transition from solid to gas without melting
