= Rupes Tenuis =

Martian north polar scarp

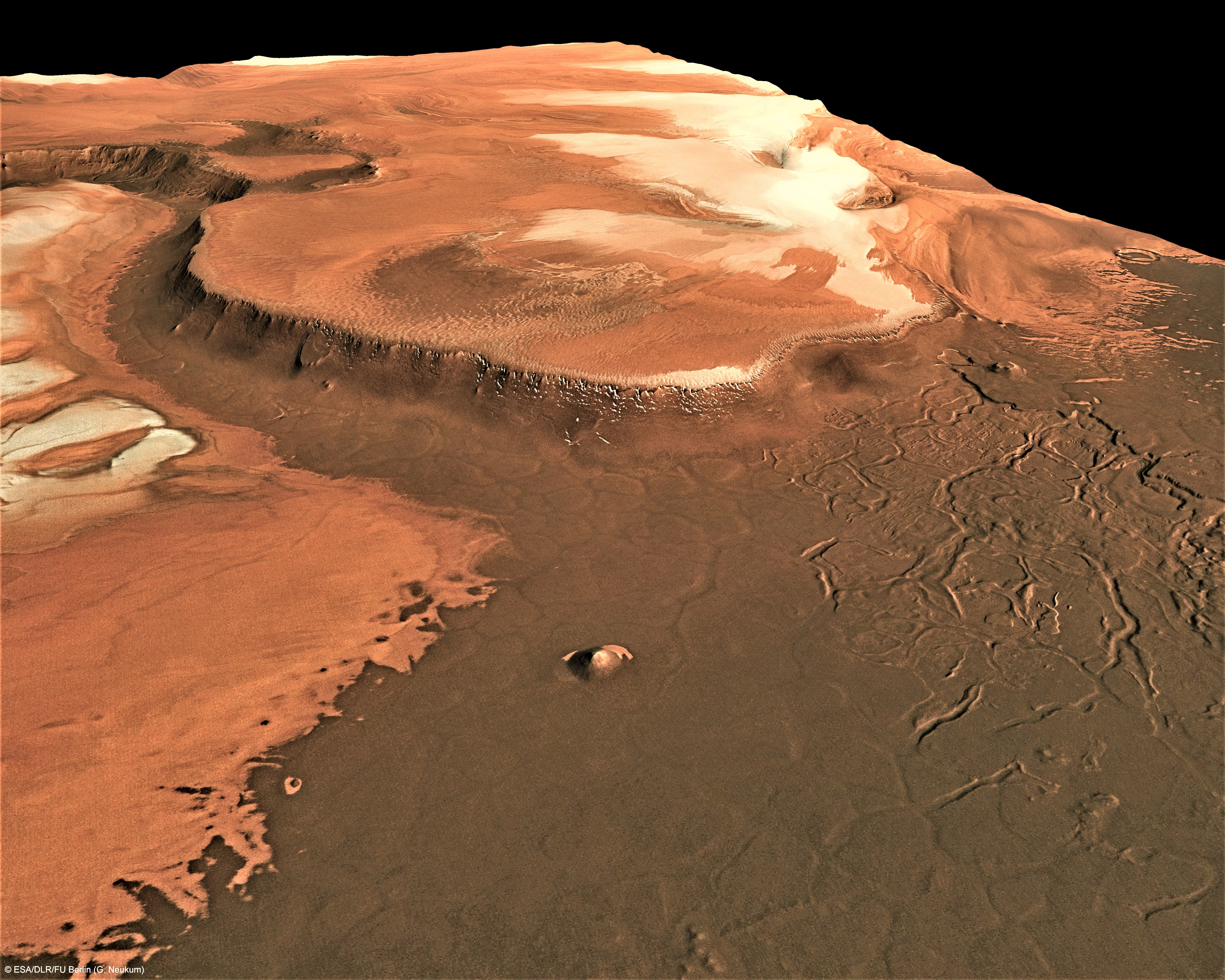
Perspective view of the Martian polar ice cap and the scarp Rupes Tenuis with Abalos Mensa on the left of the picture. Picture was taken by the Mars Express orbiter of the European Space Agency

Rupes Tenuis (Latin: thin cliff) is a Martian north polar scarp. It is named after one of the classical albedo features on Mars. Its name was officially approved by IAU in 1988. It extends from latitude 74.94°N to 82.2°N and from longitude 242.12°E to 300.77°E (59.23°W – 117.88°W). Its centre is located at latitude 81.6°N longitude 85.47°W. It marks the outer perimeter of Planum Boreum from longitude 242.12°E to 300.77°E, and it is formed by the eastern extension of the Olympia Cavi, a series of local troughs and depressions, which become longer and deeper as they merge to create the Rupes Tenuis scarp formation. The scarp is located to the west of Chasma Boreale, at the base of Planum Boreum, and its height varies from a few hundred metres to a maximum of approximately 1000 metres.

== Local topography ==
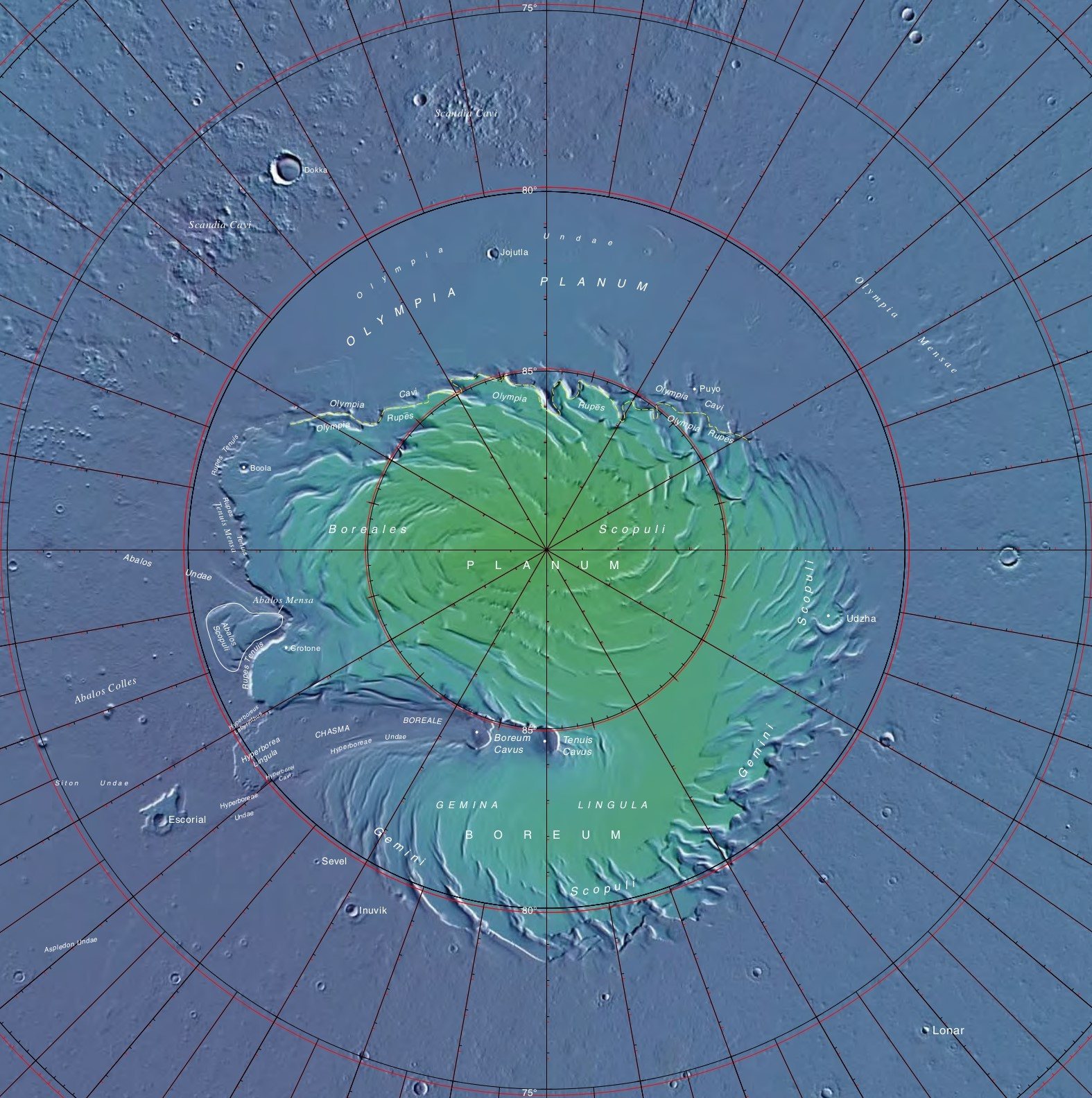
USGS map showing the location of Rupes Tenuis in Planum Boreum

Immediately to the south of Rupes Tenuis, approximately at 285ºE, lies Abalos Mensa, a convex formation of approximately 180 kilometer span, shaped like a wedge when viewed from above. The dune field of Abalos Undae continues in a southwestward direction after it emerges from the western end of a narrow channel separating Rupes Tenuis from Abalos Mensa.

Two named craters are located in the immediate area of Rupes Tenuis; Crotone, located at 82.2ºN, 290.0ºE with a 6.4 km diameter, is situated at the channel separating the scarp from Abalos Mensa, and Boola, located at 81.1ºN, 254.2ºE, with a 17 km diameter, is found close to the western boundary of the Rupes Tenuis scarp. West of Abalos Mensa, parallel to and south of the Rupes Tenuis scarp, runs a narrow, low-altitude plain, named Tenuis Mensa, which exhibits a southward slope.

== Erosion characteristics ==
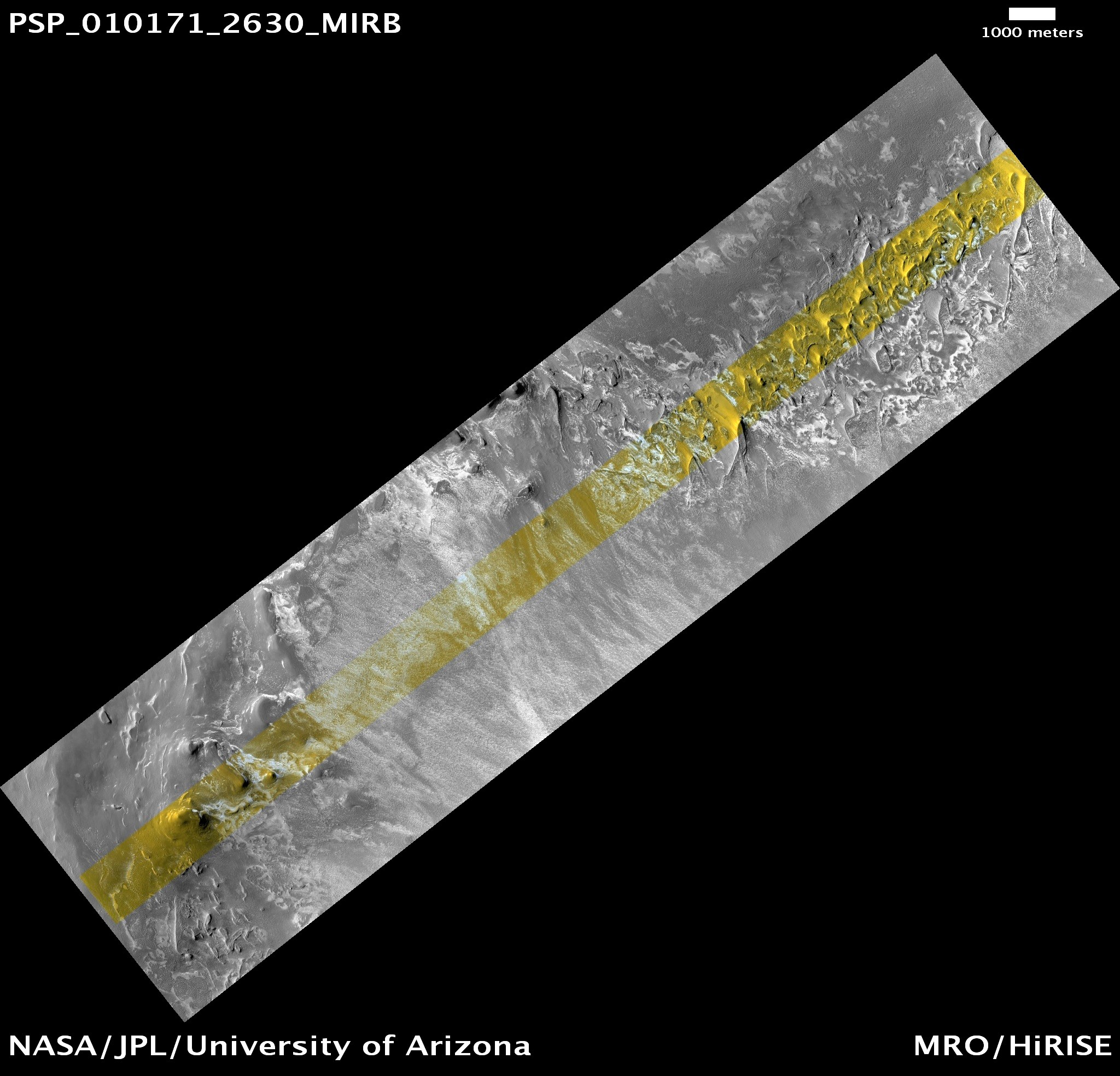
Upper Rupes Tenuis unit exposed northwest of Crotone crater

The proposed erosion mechanism for the polar basal unit in general, and Rupes Tenuis in particular, are katabatic winds (From Greek: katabasis, "descent", i.e. strong winds descending from Planum Boreum), and solar ablation. These mechanisms are also considered responsible for the modern-day erosion and retreat of the Rupes Tenuis scarp, the existence of conical mounds and promontories in the immediate vicinity of the scarp, and the creation of the narrow channels that separate Abalos Mensa from the scarp. This erosion process is theorised to have existed since the Late Amazonian period on Mars, and it is considered to have contributed to the continuous retreat of the polar scarp from an older southern latitude as low as 74ºN.

It is further theorised that the Rupes Tenuis stratigraphic unit may have been a paleo-plateau that descended further South than the present-day Rupes Tenuis scarp. Geological formations in the vicinity of the scarp, such as mounds, are considered to have been formed by erosion mechanisms rather than volcanic activity. The horizontal attitude (inclination) of the layers of the Rupes Tenuis unit, further indicates the non-volcanic origin of these formations, since layers of volcanic origin are not typically horizontal. Nearby formations such as Abalos Colles — a group of five, flat or concave top, mounds, less than 700 m high and less than 1 km in diameter — are considered to be erosional remnants of a once-continuous stratigraphic unit, the Rupes Tenuis unit.

== Images by NASA and ESA ==
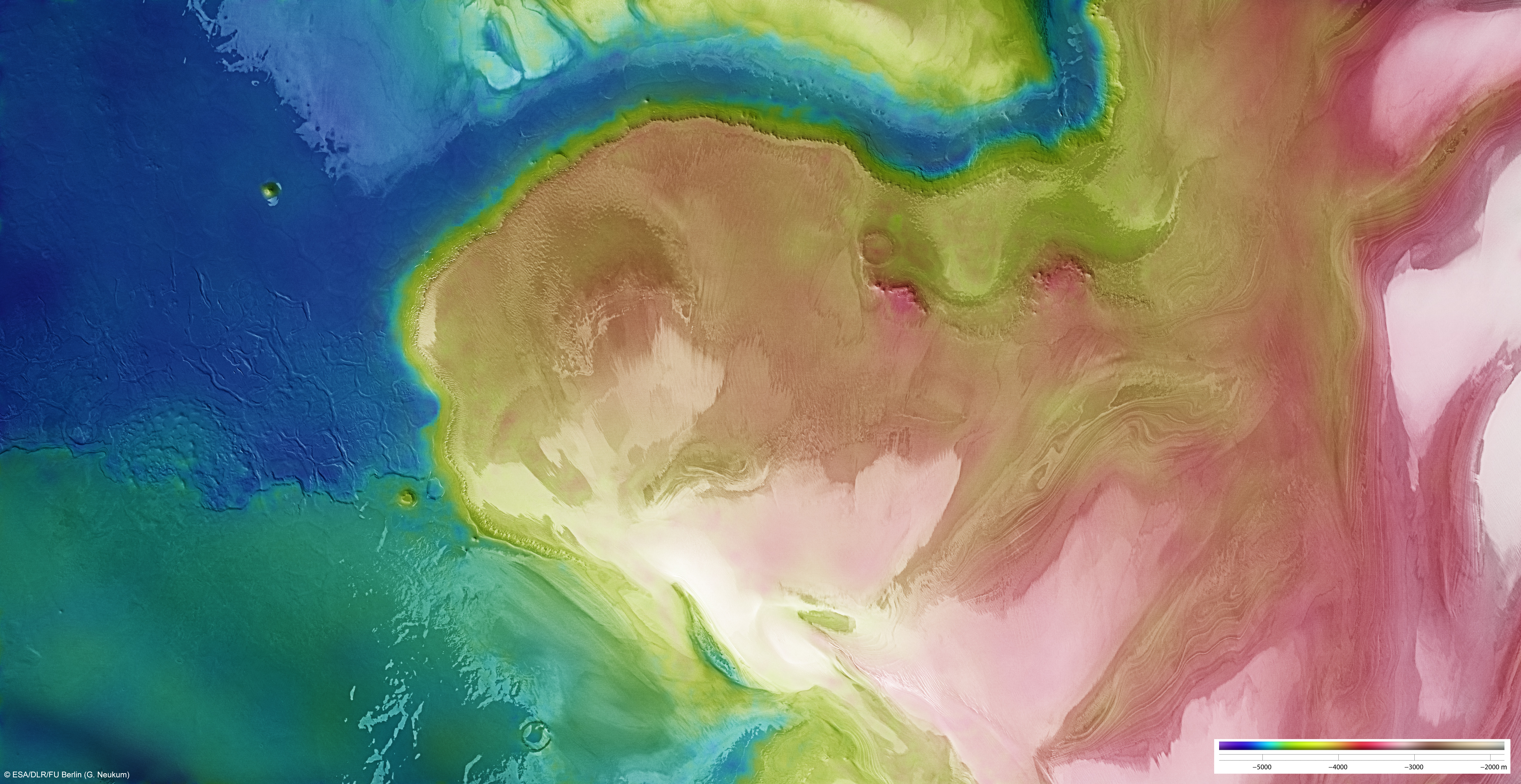
The Rupes Tenuis scarp with Abalos Mensa at the top of the picture. Picture was taken by the Mars Express orbiter of the European Space Agency

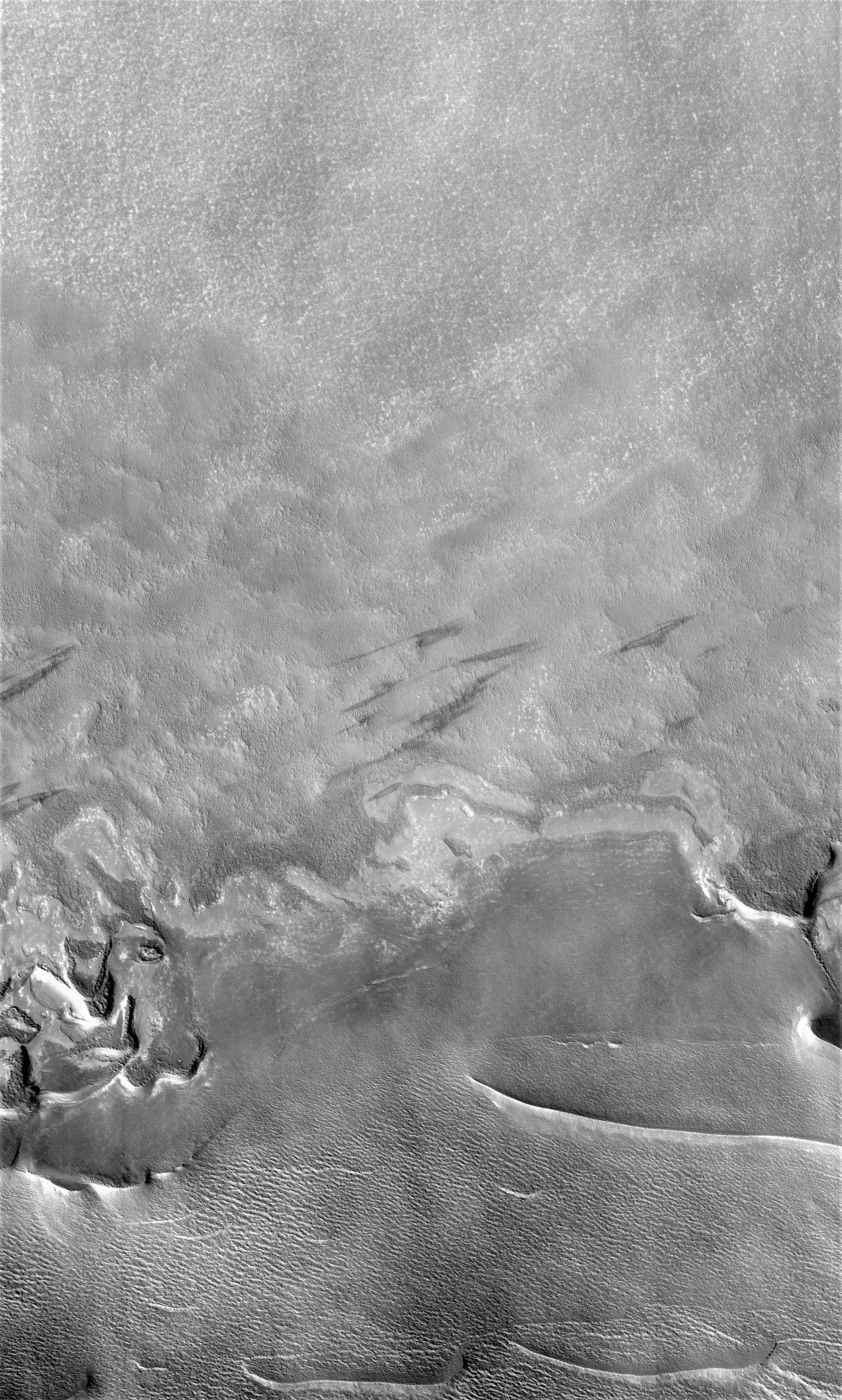
Rupes Tenuis scarp

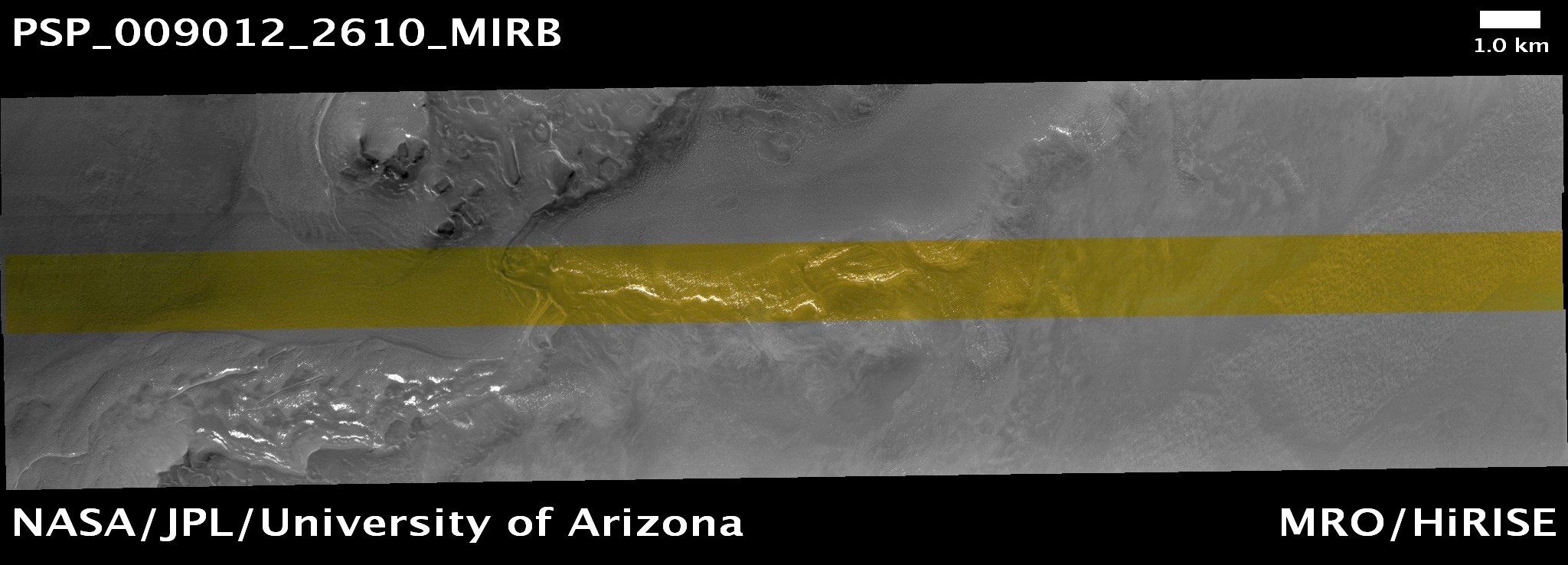
Boola crater ejecta exposed on Rupes Tenuis

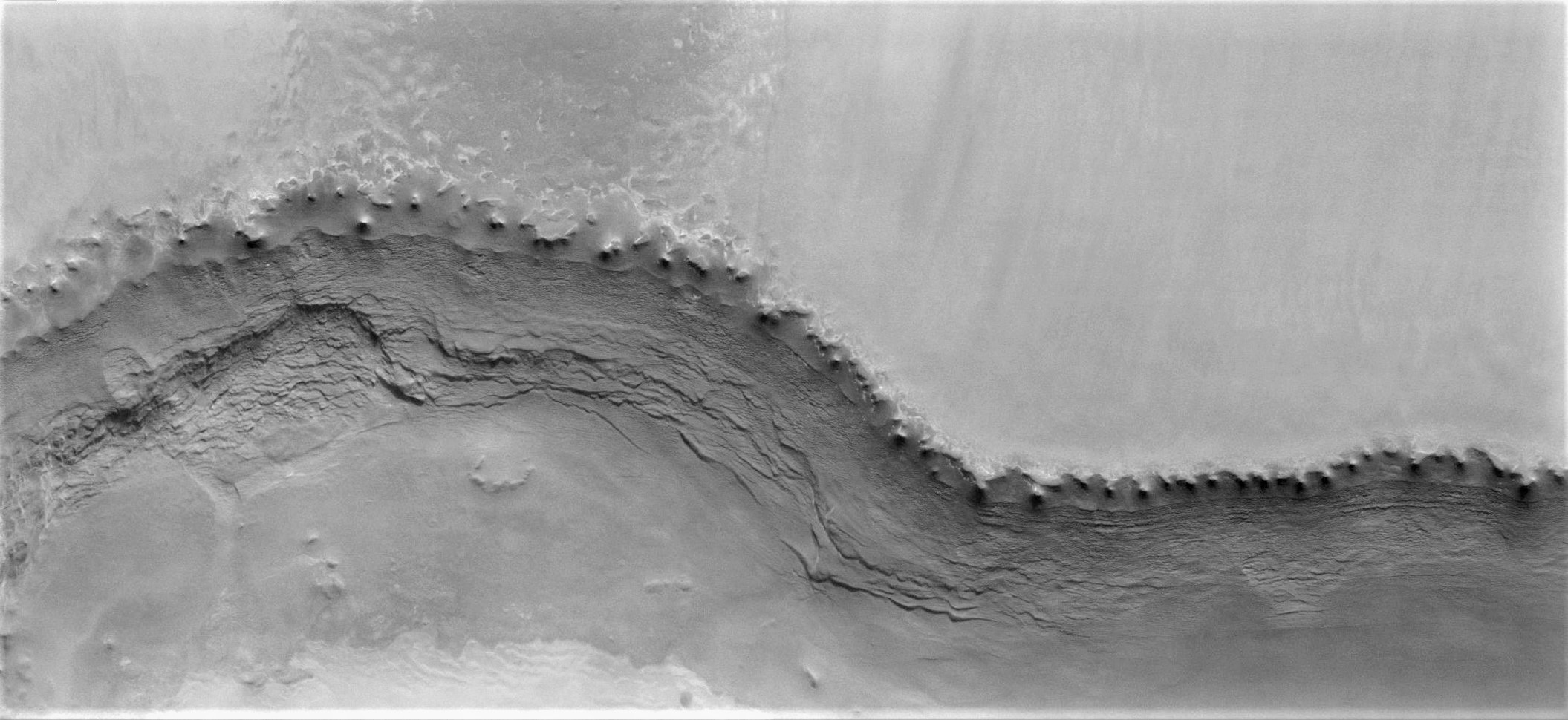
Rupes Tenuis is the strip in the middle of the image. The polar cap is on the top side of the image with the lower elevation at the bottom.

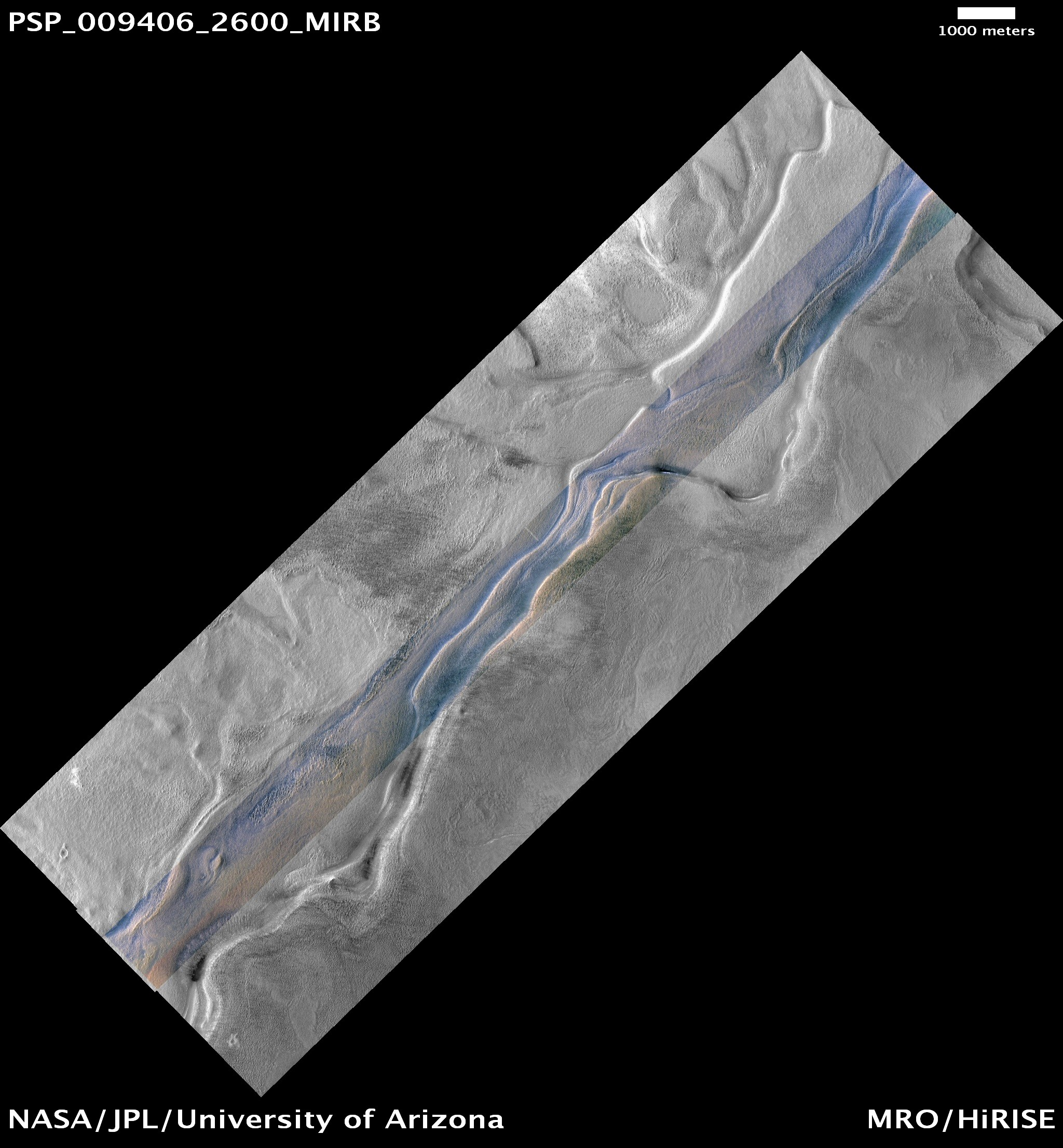
Exposed Rupes Tenuis of the southern margin of Hyperborea Lingula

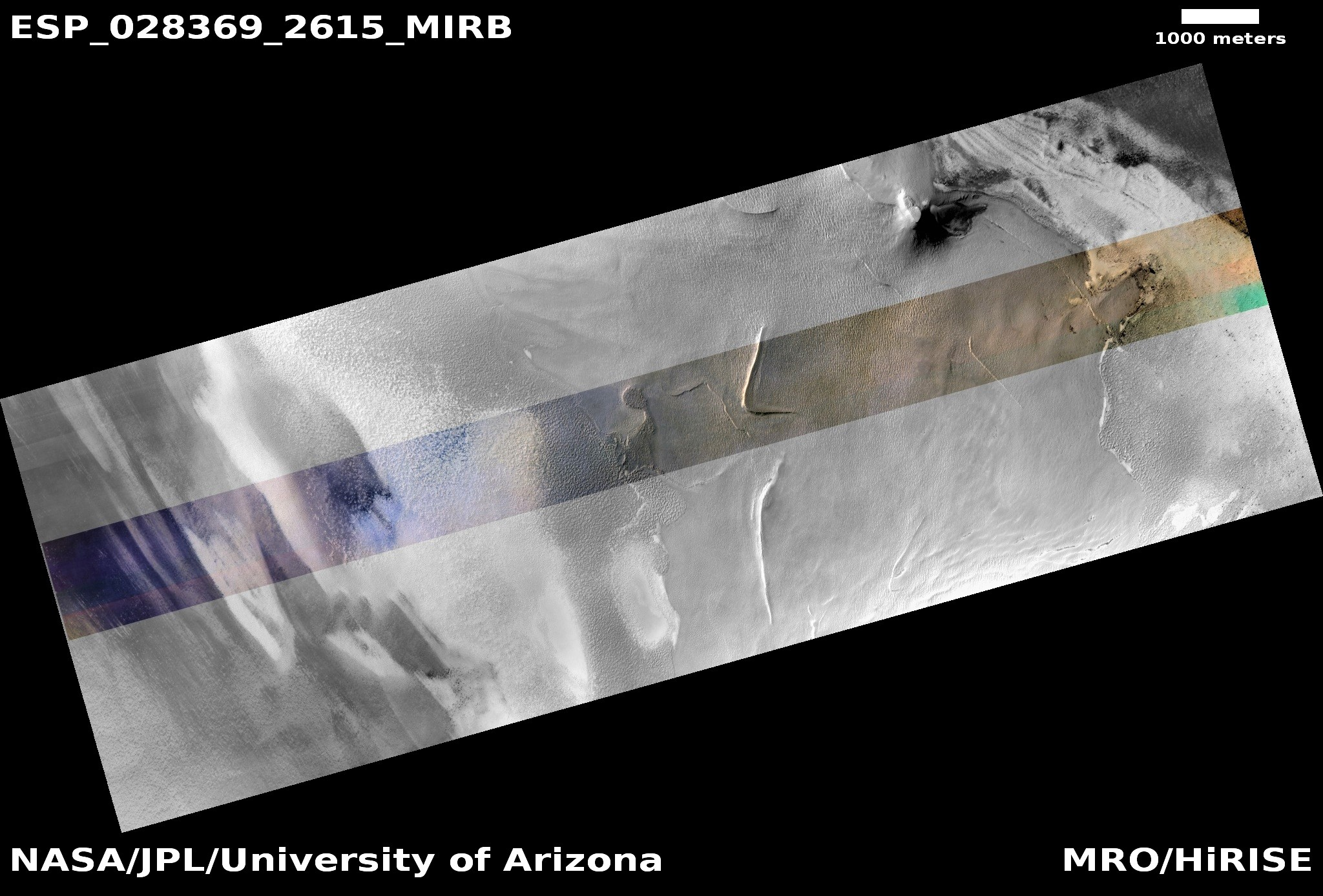
Rupes Tenuis

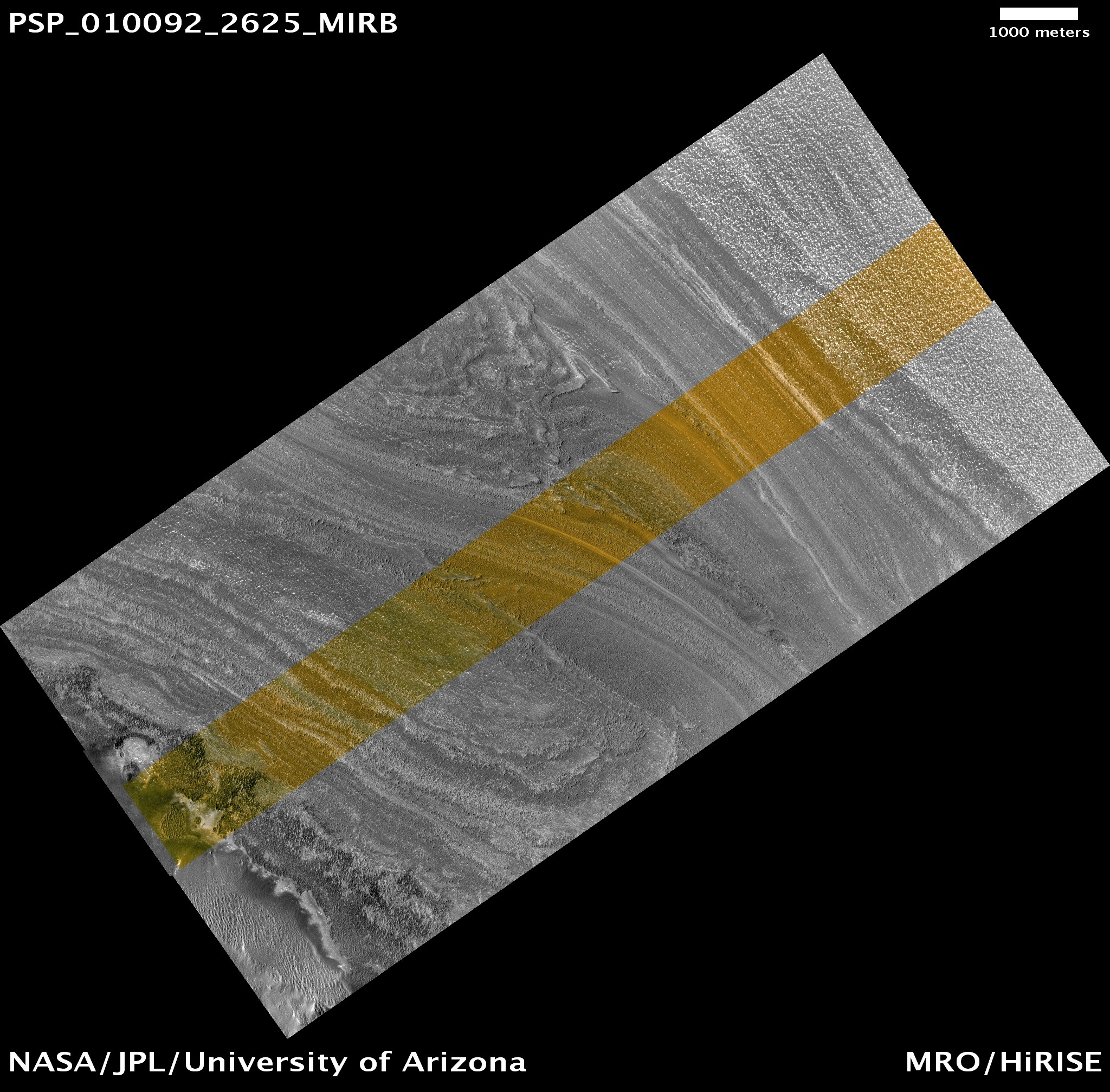
Basal Rupes Tenuis unit exposed north of Abalos Mensa

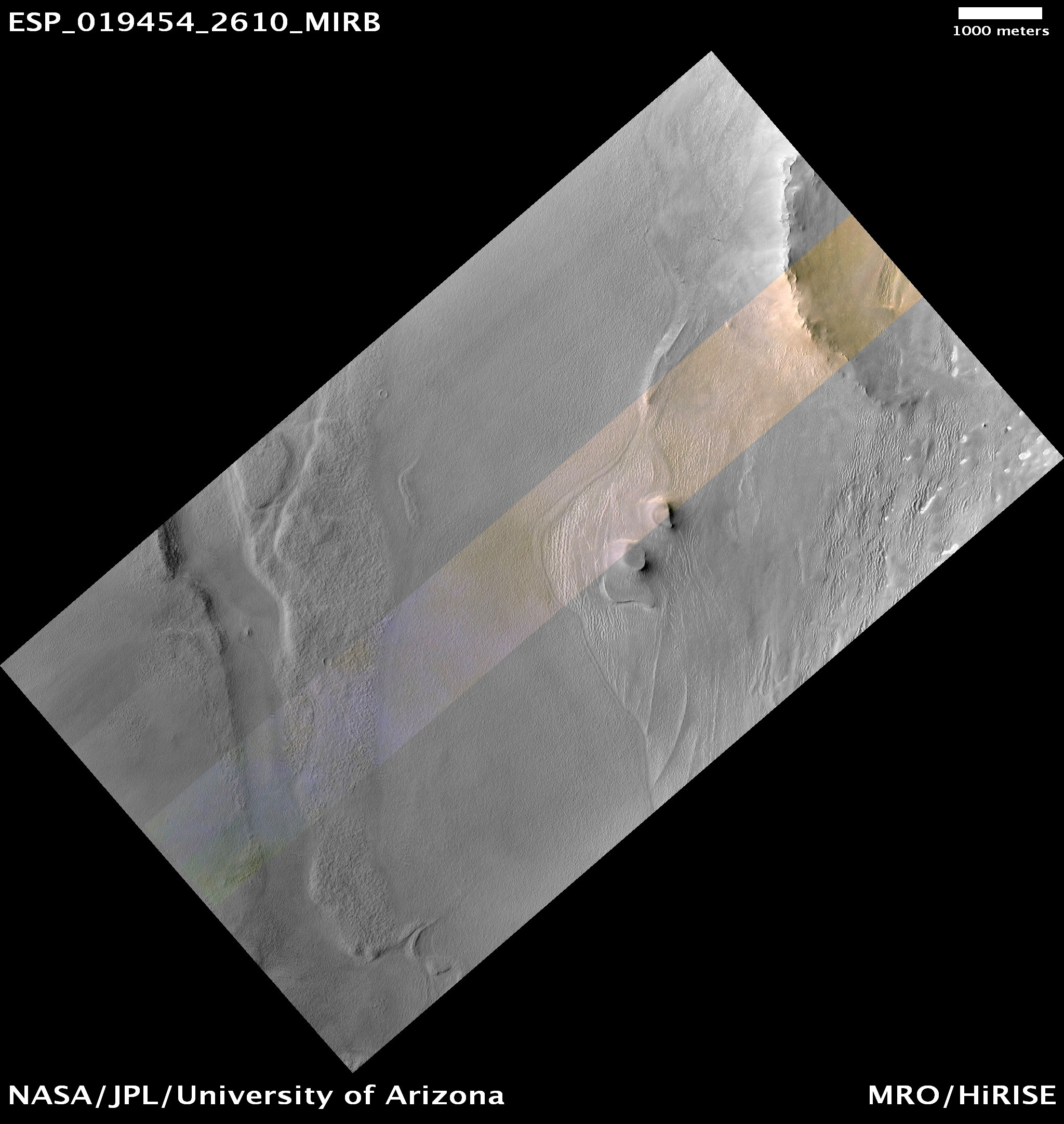
Contact between Rupes Tenuis scarp and buried polygon

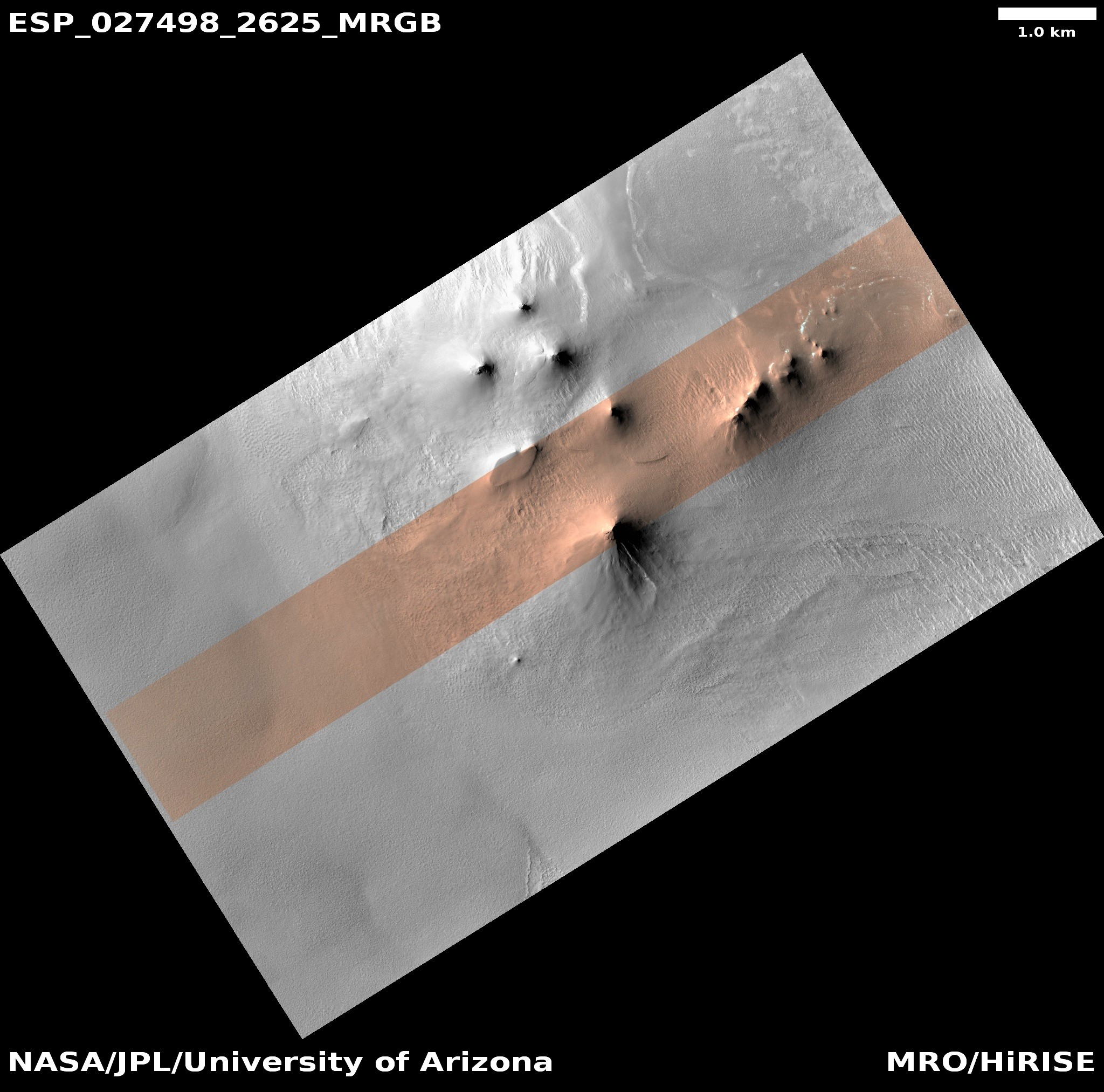
Rupes Tenuis Promontory

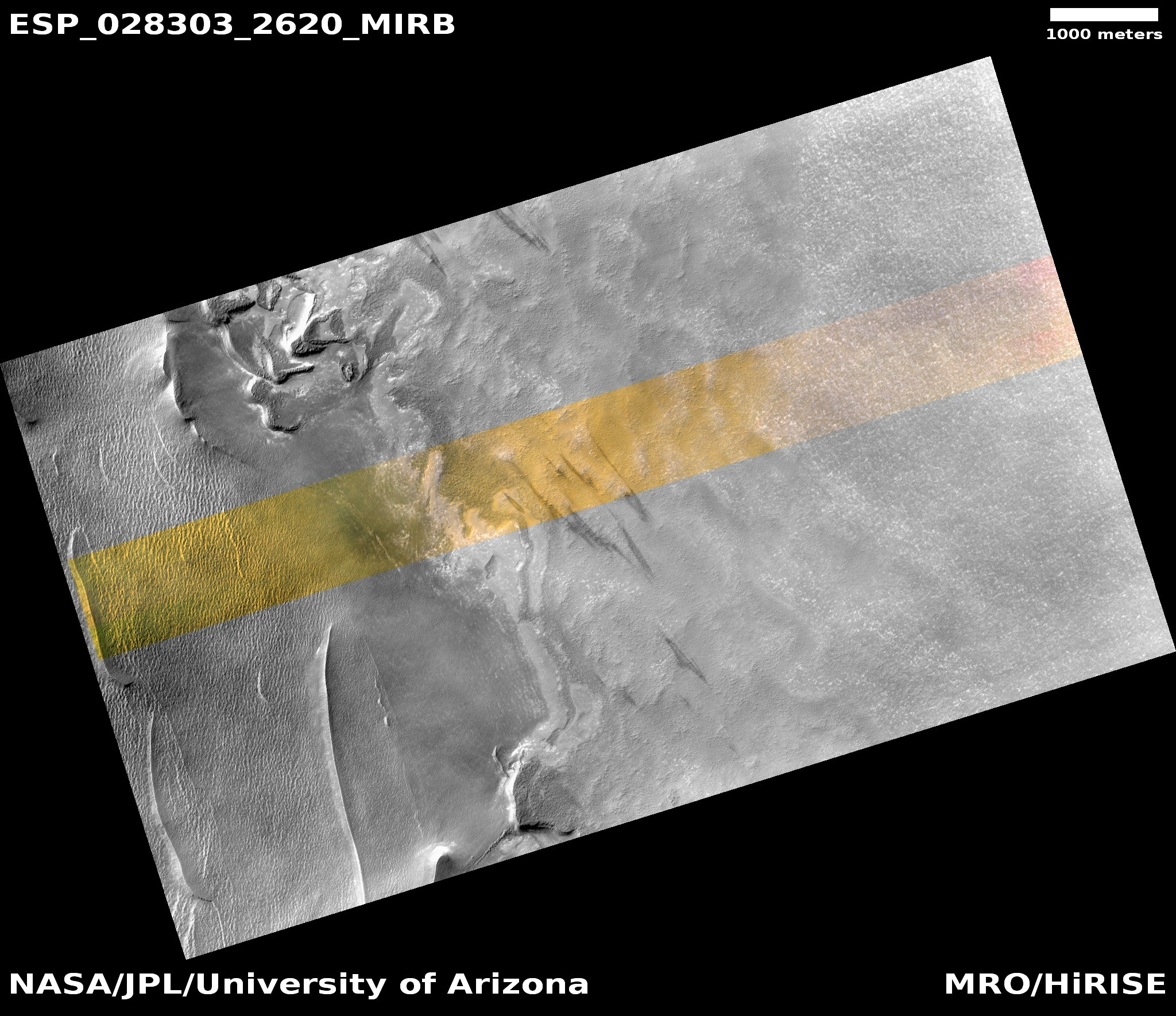
Rupes Tenuis

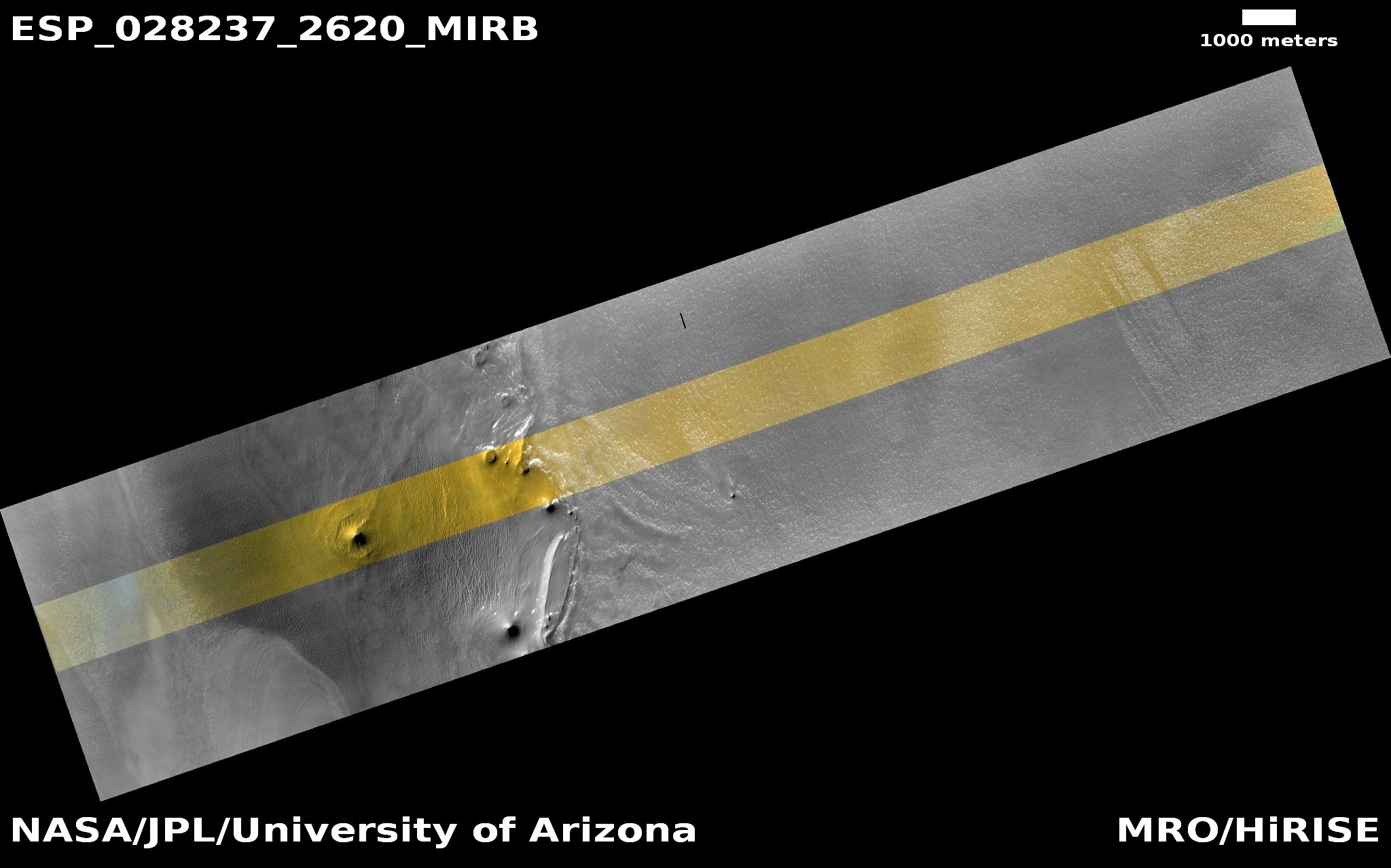
Rupes Tenuis

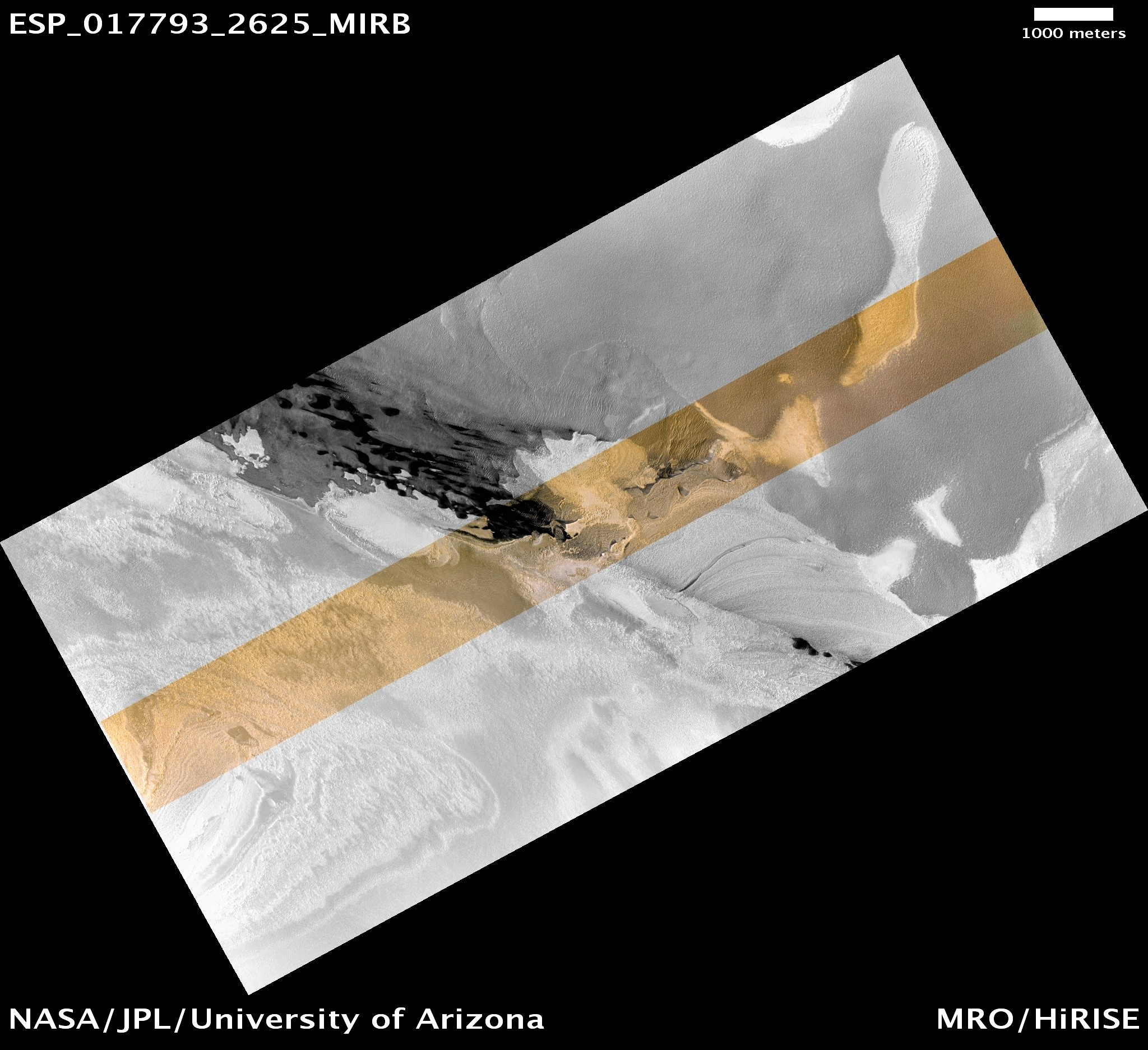
Interaction between Abalos Mensa and Rupes Tenuis dunes

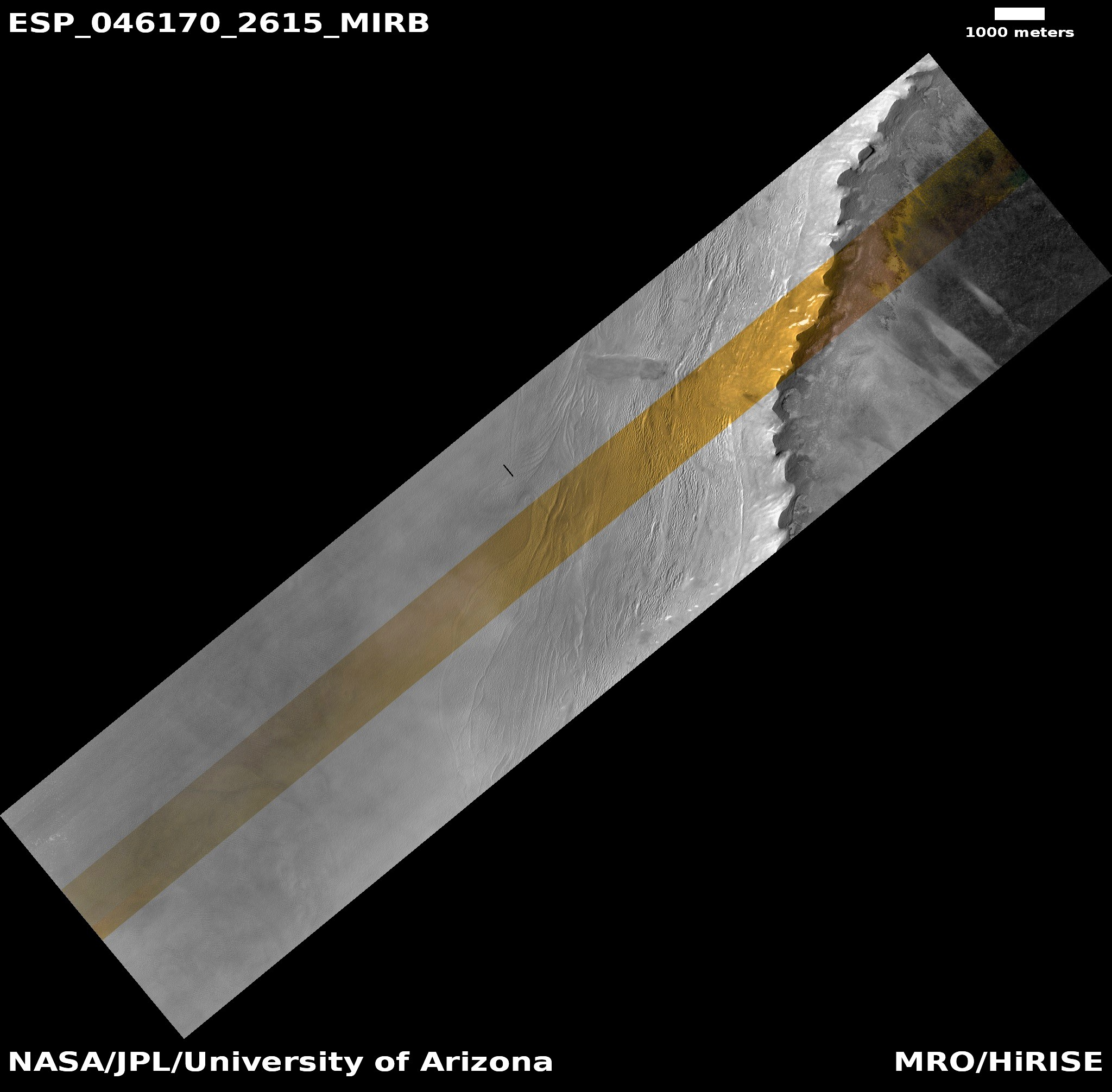
Rupes Tenuis scarp

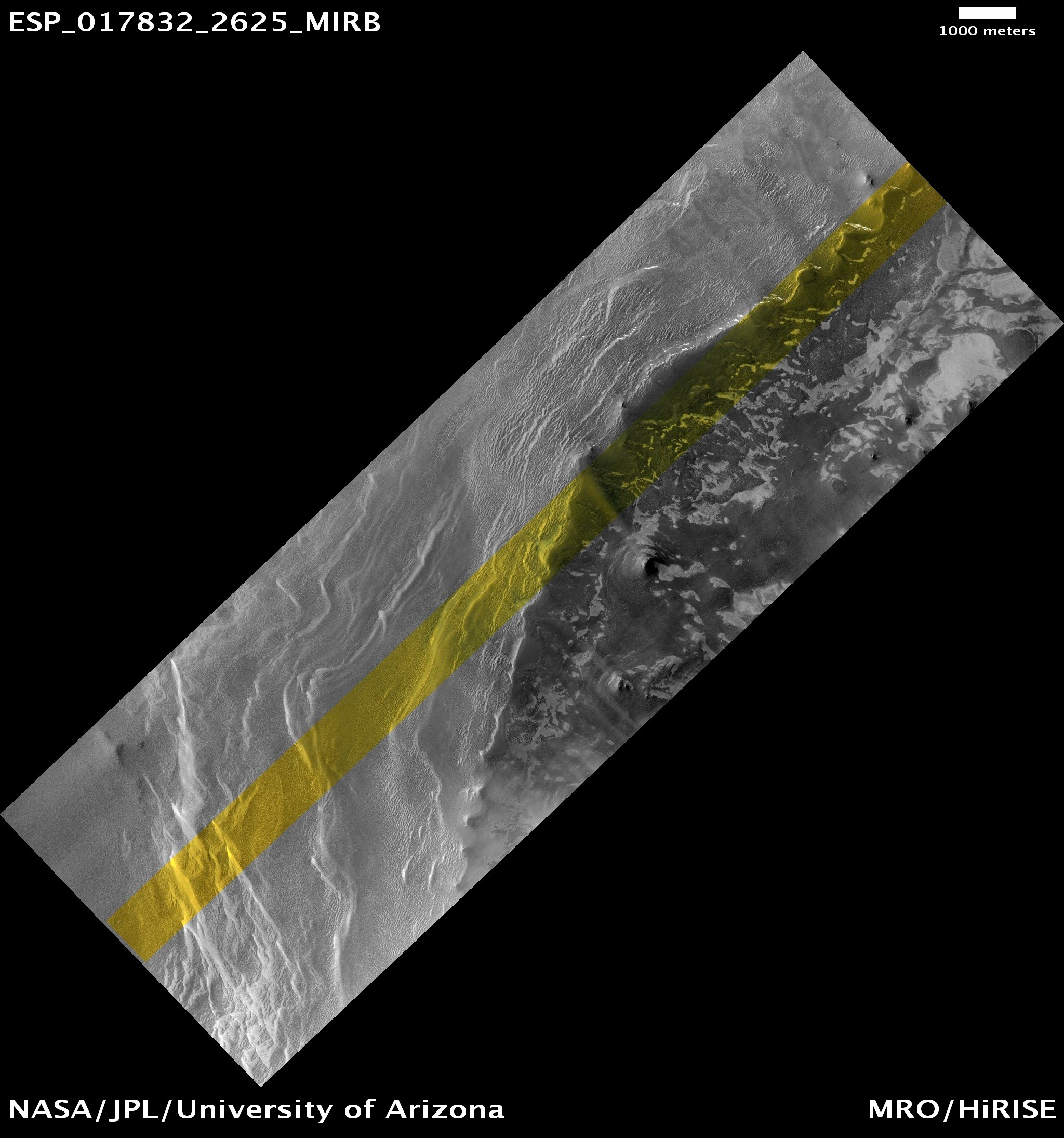
Basal Rupes Tenuis unit exposed north of Abalos Mensa

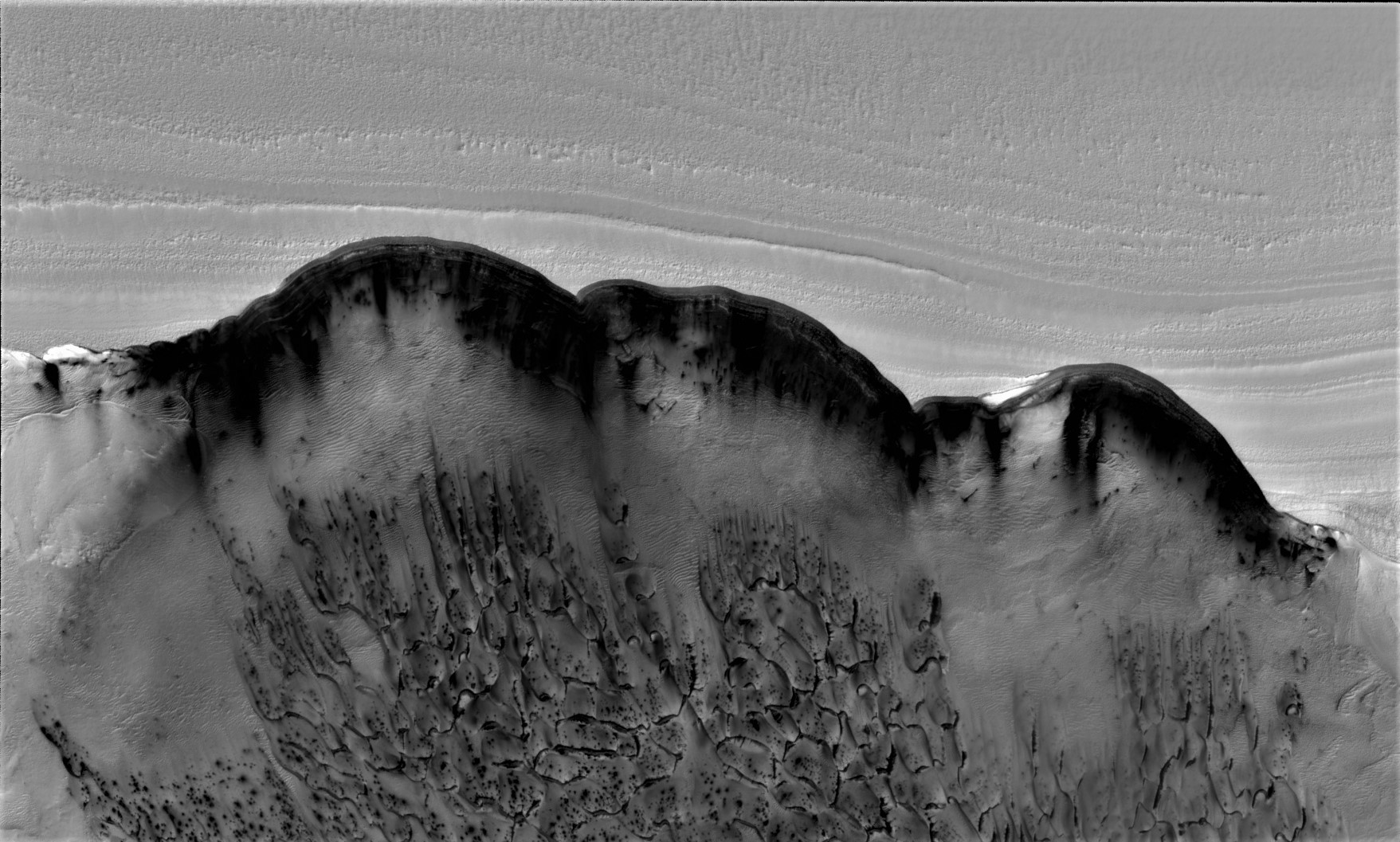
North Polar scarp in Abalos Undae with basal exposure and dunes

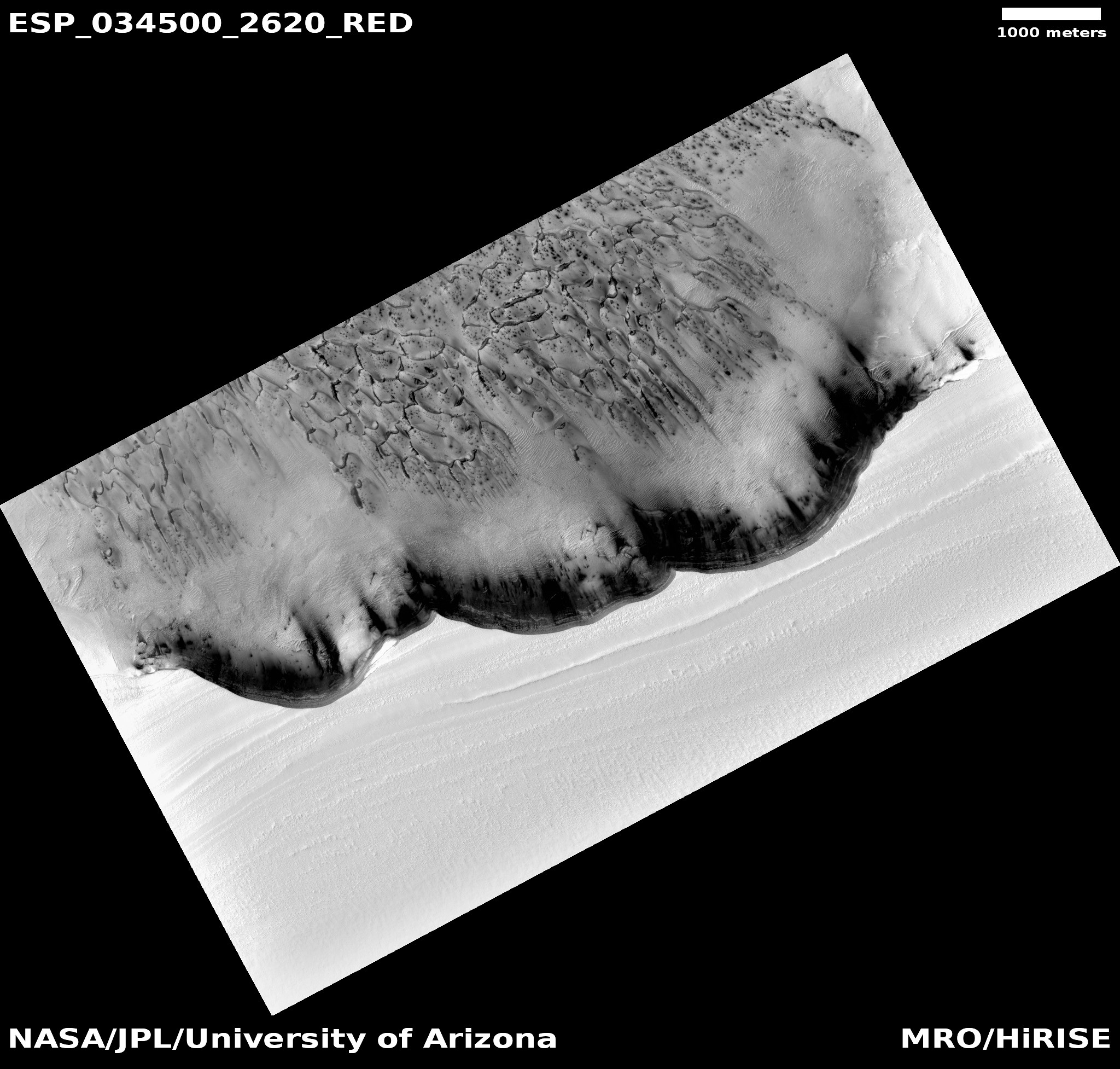
North Polar scarp in Abalos Undae with basal exposure and dunes and distance scale
