= Abalos Mensa =

Martian mensa

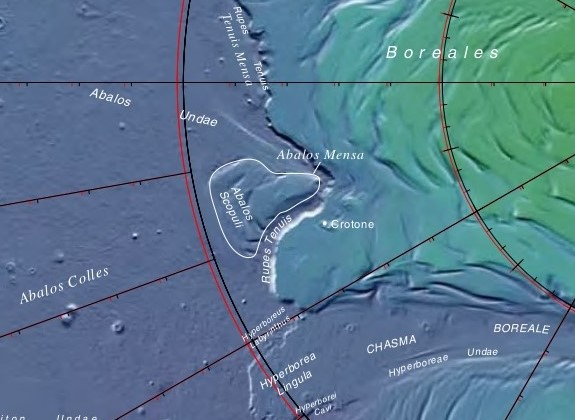
- Close-up of USGS map showing the location of Abalos Mensa in Planum Boreum in the vicinity of Rupes Tenuis, showing also Abalos Colles, Abalos Scopuli, and Tenuis Mensa.
- Coordinates: 81.17°N 284.4°E

Abalos Mensa is a wedge-shaped mound, or mensa and one of the named features in the vicinity of Planum Boreum, the Martian North pole. It is named after one of the classical albedo features on Mars. Its name was officially approved by IAU in 2006. It extends from latitude 80.21°N to 82.4°N and from longitude 279.34°E to 290.52°E (69.48°W – 80.66°W). Its centre is located at latitude 81.17°N, longitude 284.4°E (75.6°W), and has a diameter of 129.18 km.

Abalos Mensa is a convex formation of approximately 180 kilometer span, with a top-view shaped like a wedge, and lies immediately to the south of the Rupes Tenuis scarp, approximately at 285ºE. In the neighbourhood of Abalos Mensa is the beginning of the dune field of Abalos Undae which continues in a southwestward direction after it emerges from the western end of a narrow channel separating Rupes Tenuis from Abalos Mensa. Crotone crater, located at 82.2ºN, 290.0ºE with a 6.4 km diameter, is situated at the channel separating the Rupes Tenuis scarp from Abalos Mensa. West of Abalos Mensa, parallel to and south of the Rupes Tenuis scarp, runs a narrow, low-altitude plain, named Tenuis Mensa, which exhibits a southward slope. The southern part of Abalos Mensa ends in a scarp called Abalos Scopuli.

== Formation theories ==
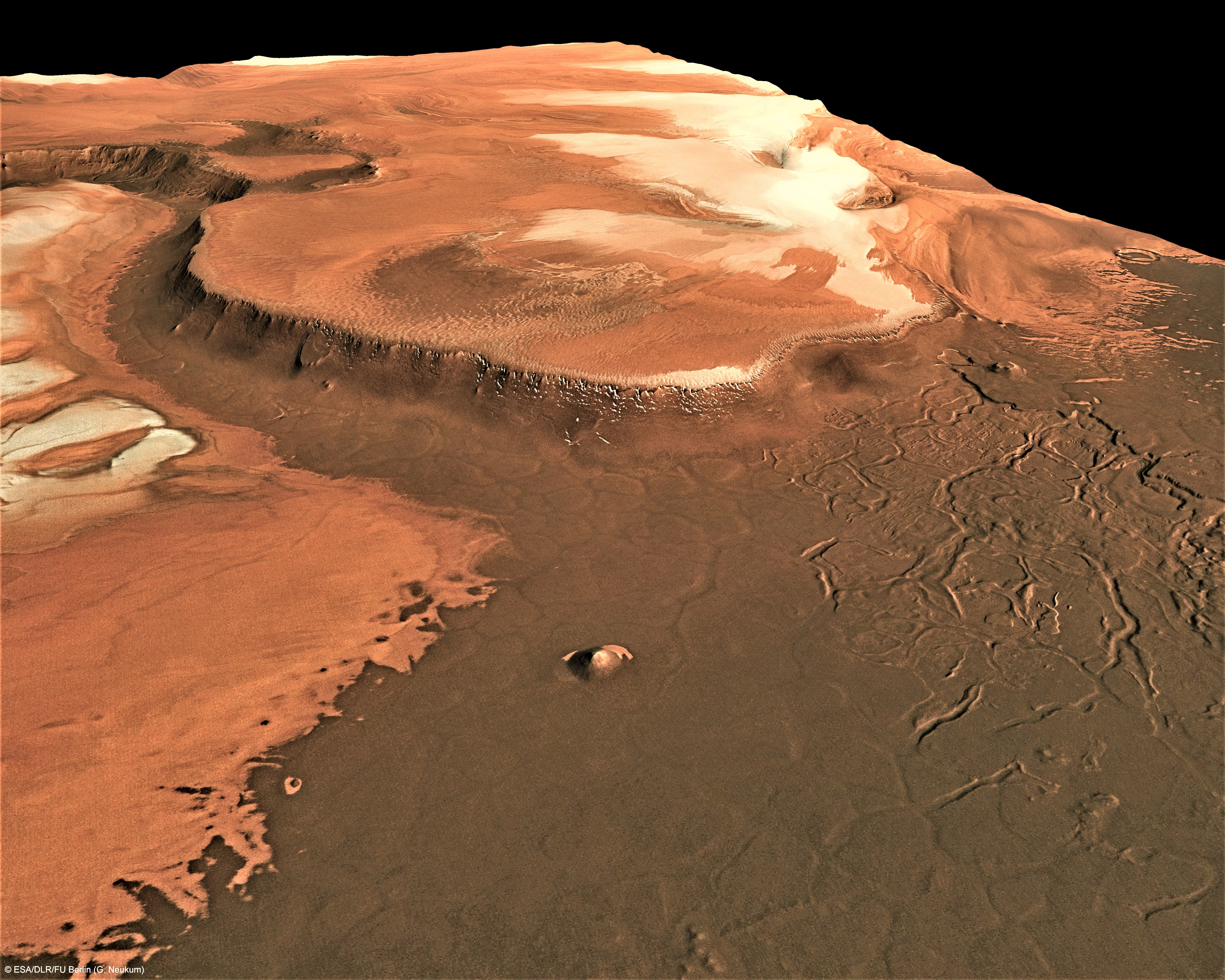
Perspective view of the Martian polar ice cap and the Rupes Tenuis scarp with Abalos Mensa on the left of the picture. Picture was taken by the Mars Express orbiter of the European Space Agency

Research on the stratigraphic analysis of the Martian circumpolar deposits is ongoing because it provides information on the ancient climate and geological formation processes of the planet. The circumpolar deposit of Abalos Mensa has been described as an "enigmatic wedge of material", which has been studied by scientists due to its uncommon location and shape characteristics. Formation theories for Abalos Mensa primarily propose erosional processes based either on fluid action or wind action; the latter are known as Aeolian processes, named after Aeolus, the ancient Greek God of the wind.

The fluid flow theories propose fluid action which would erode the surrounding area and produce the channels that separate Abalos Mensa from the main ice cap. The fluid flow theories require volcanic action which would provide the thermal energy to melt the polar materials which would then flow and cause erosion of the area. There have been a number of questions raised about the fluid flow theories, including the uncertainty of volcanic activity in the Planum Boreum region.

Impact-shielding-based Aeolian theories propose that ancient material from the base of Planum Boreum was protected by ejecta from an impact crater, and when the old base material of the surrounding area disappeared, the protected mound acted like a source for further accumulation of new deposits, which, with time, produced the mound of Abalos Mensa.

A modified, numerical, Aeolian-based approach uses the data provided by the SHARAD, HiRISE, and MOLA instruments on board the Mars Reconnaissance Orbiter, to produce a topographic simulation of the area of Abalos Mensa, which is then combined with weather modeling to produce a simulation of the weather conditions and morphological evolution of the area. This approach has determined that the form of Abalos Mensa can be derived using the computer simulation without the need for assumptions such as polar volcanic activity, or impact-shielding of the old polar basal unit.

== Images by NASA and ESA ==
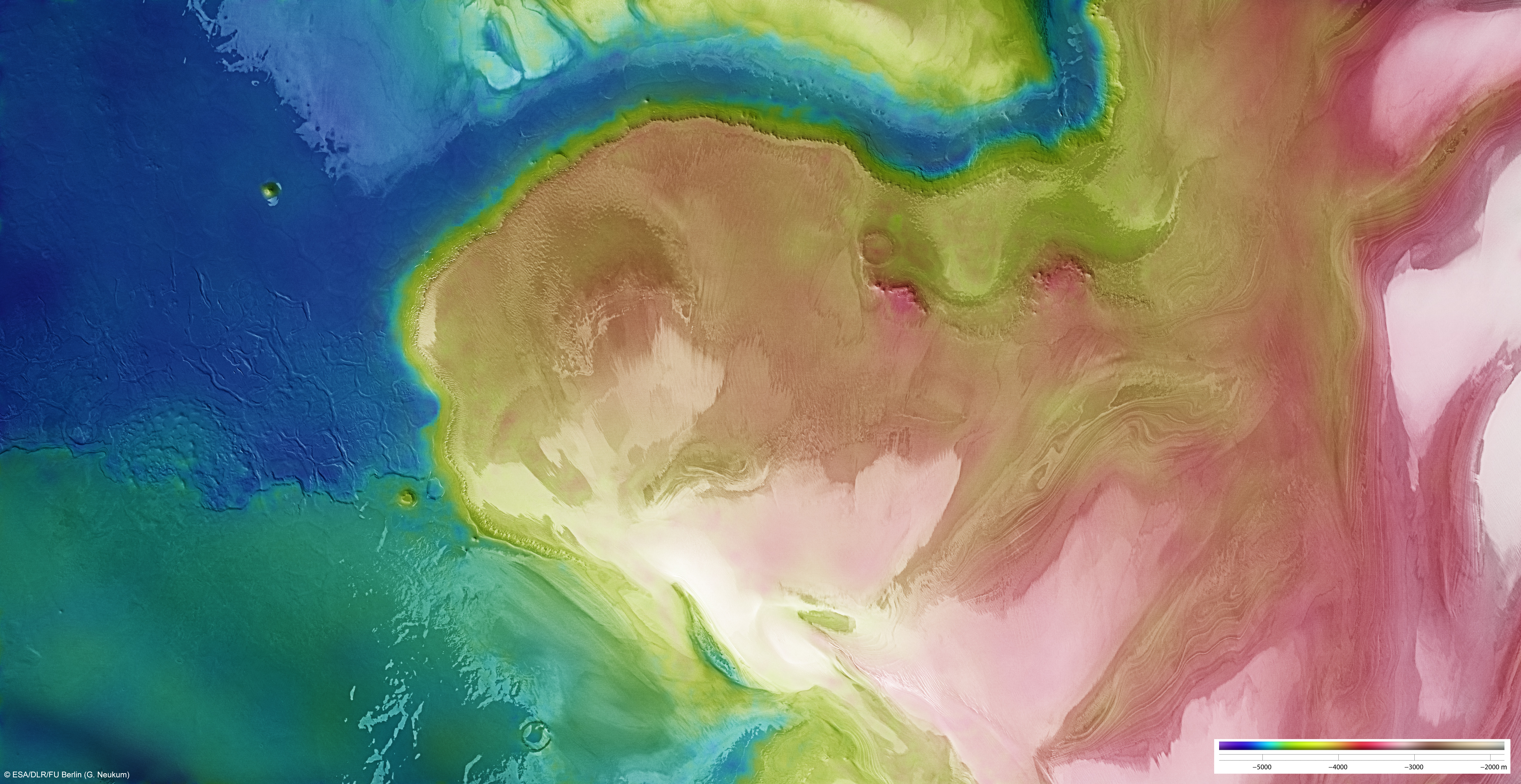
The Rupes Tenuis scarp with Abalos Mensa at the top of the picture. Picture was taken by the European Space Agency

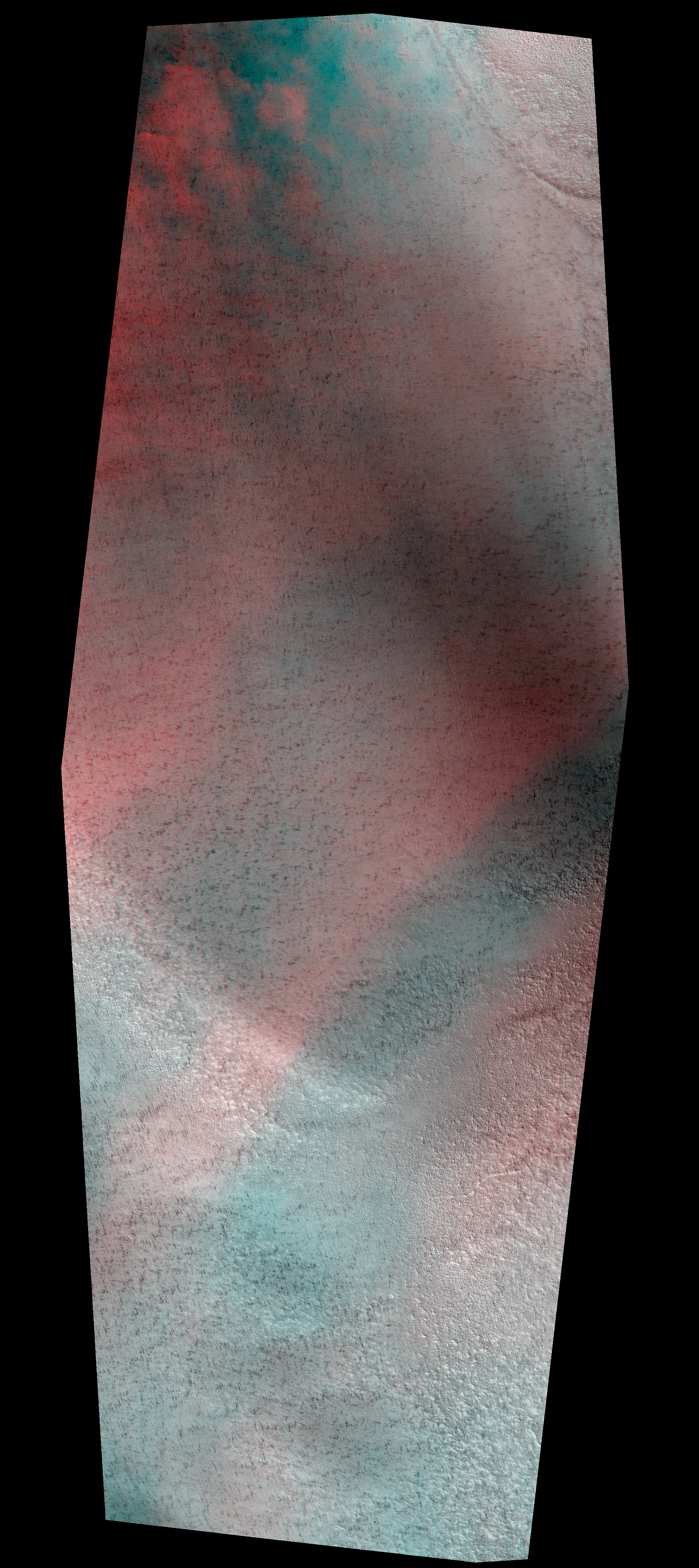
Abalos Mensa and Abalos Scopuli in anaglyph 3D

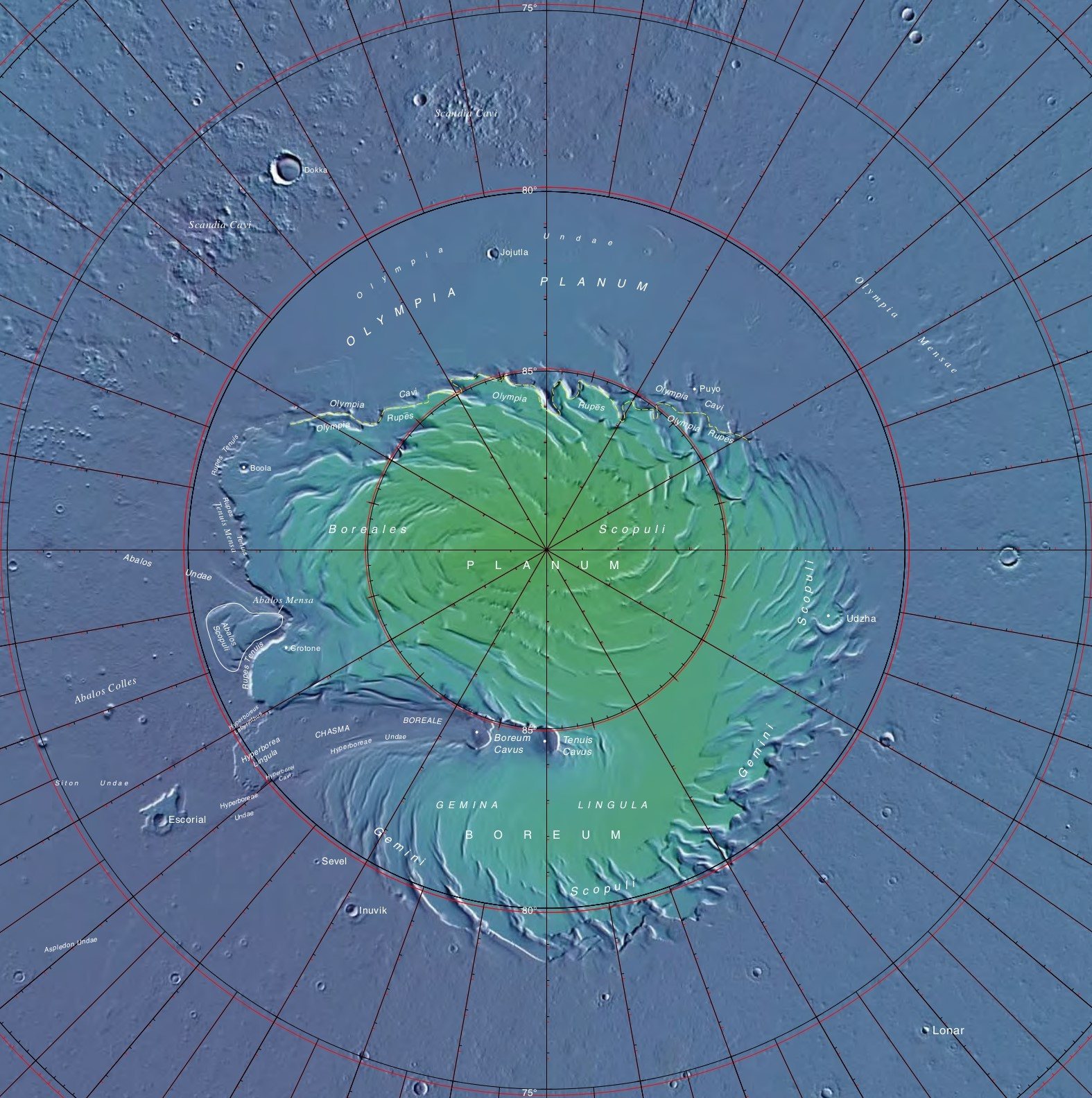
USGS map showing the location of Abalos Mensa in Planum Boreum. The prime meridian is at the bottom of the map. Abalos Mensa is shown on left, between longitude 279.342°E to 290.52°E (69.48°W – 80.66°W).

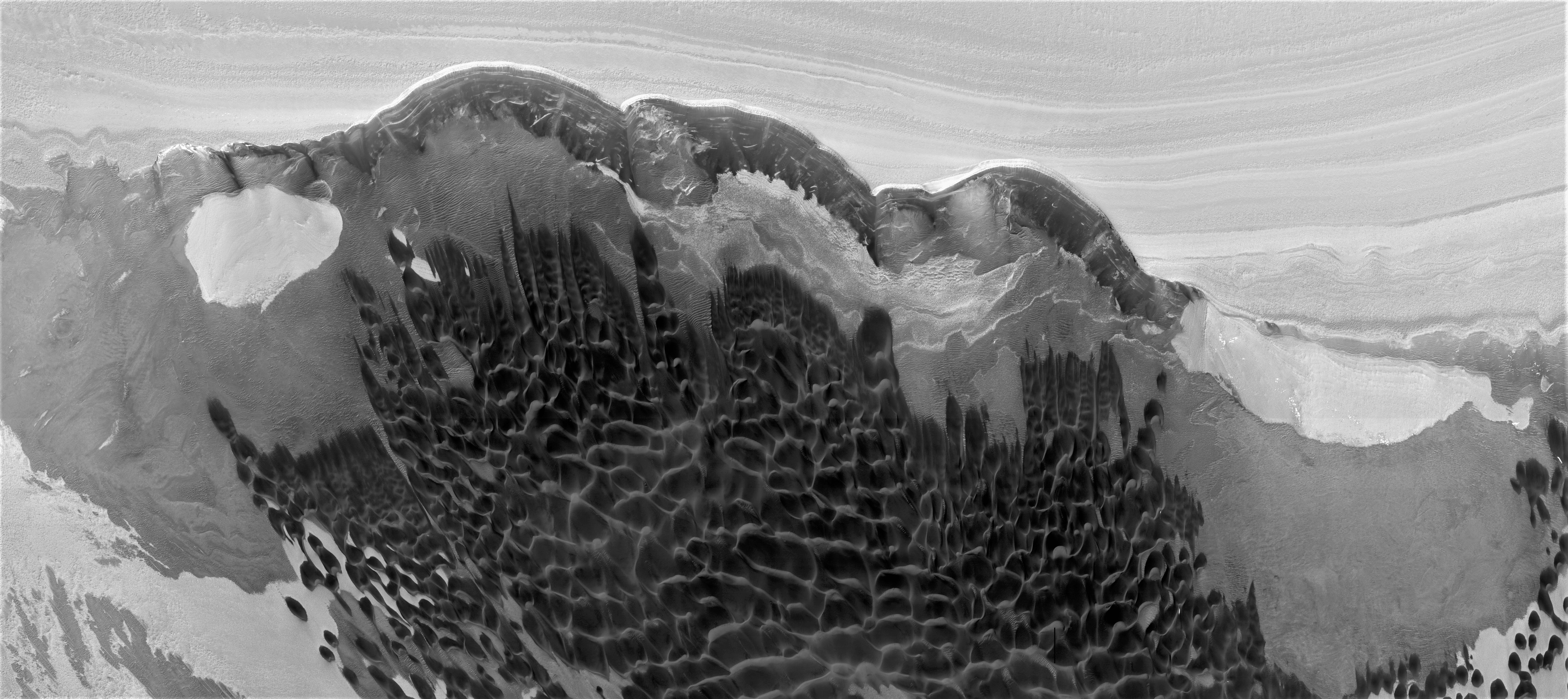
Abalos Undae at Abalos Scopuli, the scarp of Abalos Mensa

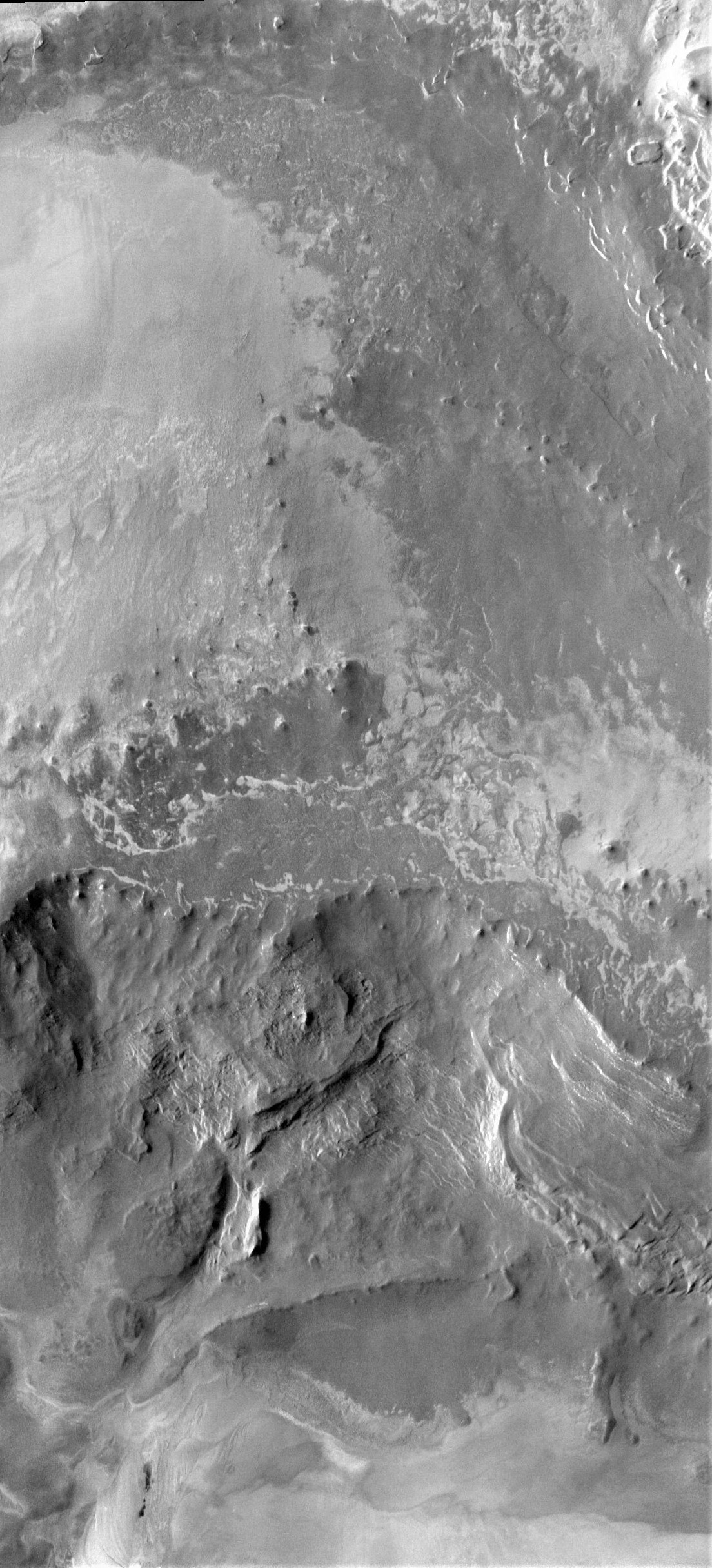
Scarp face of the north polar cap near Abalos Mensa. VIS image shows the scarp face of the north polar cap near Abalos Mensa. The top part of the image is the polar cap. This image was collected during northern hemisphere summer.

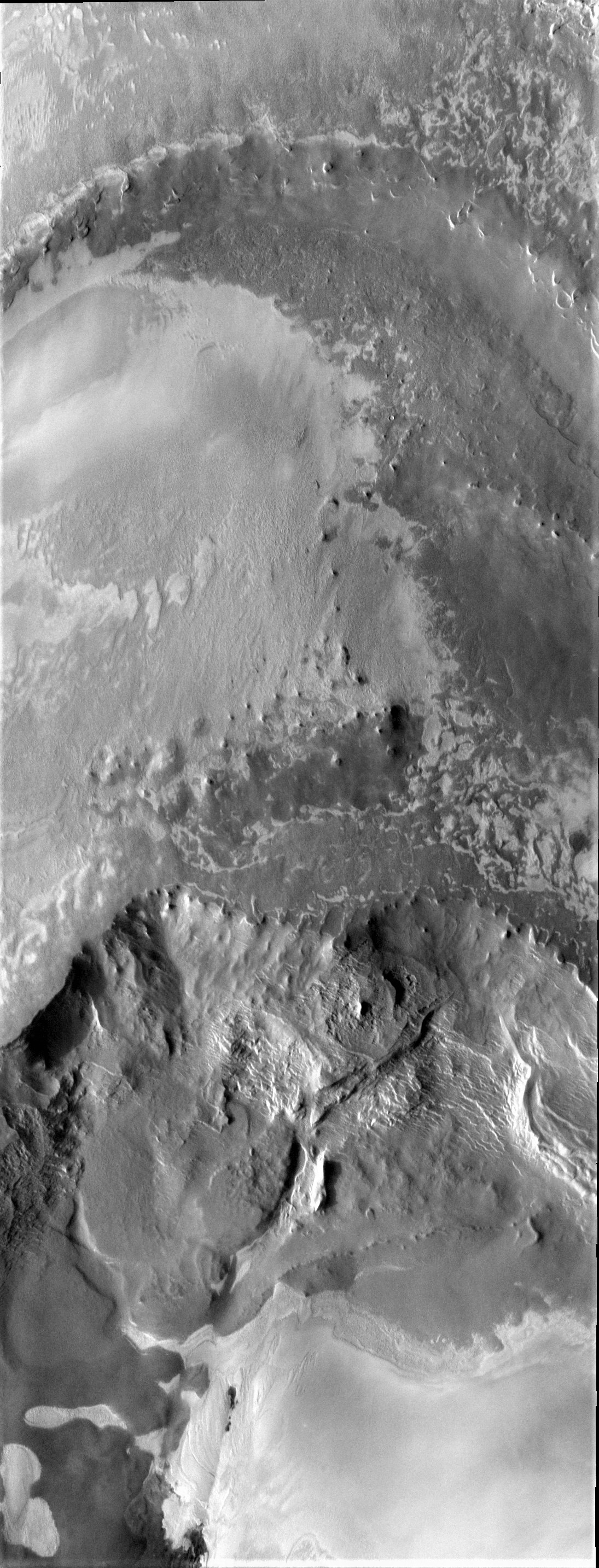
Abalos Scopuli at Latitude: 82.7088ºN Longitude: 285.791ºE

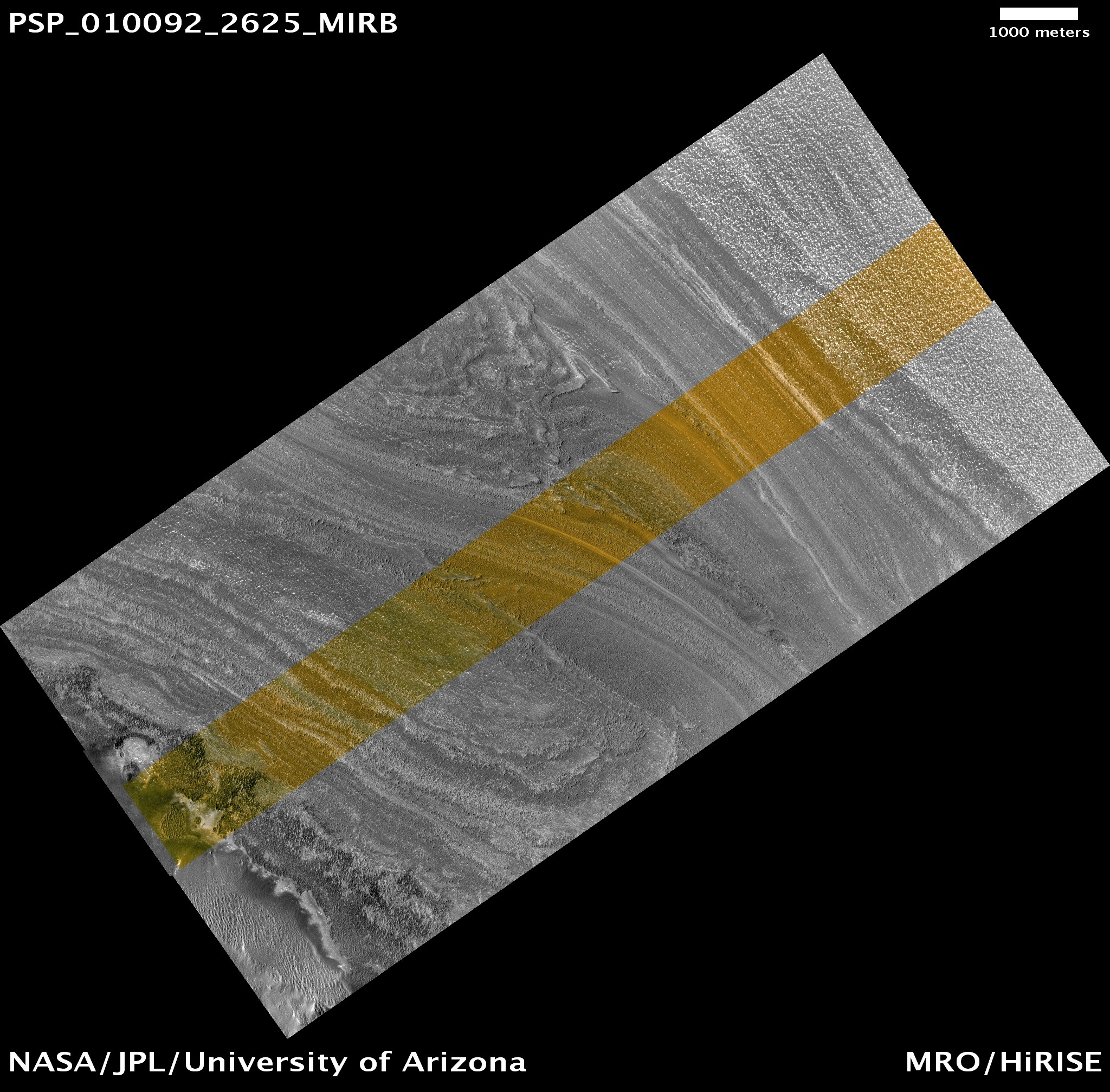
Basal Rupes Tenuis unit exposed north of Abalos Mensa

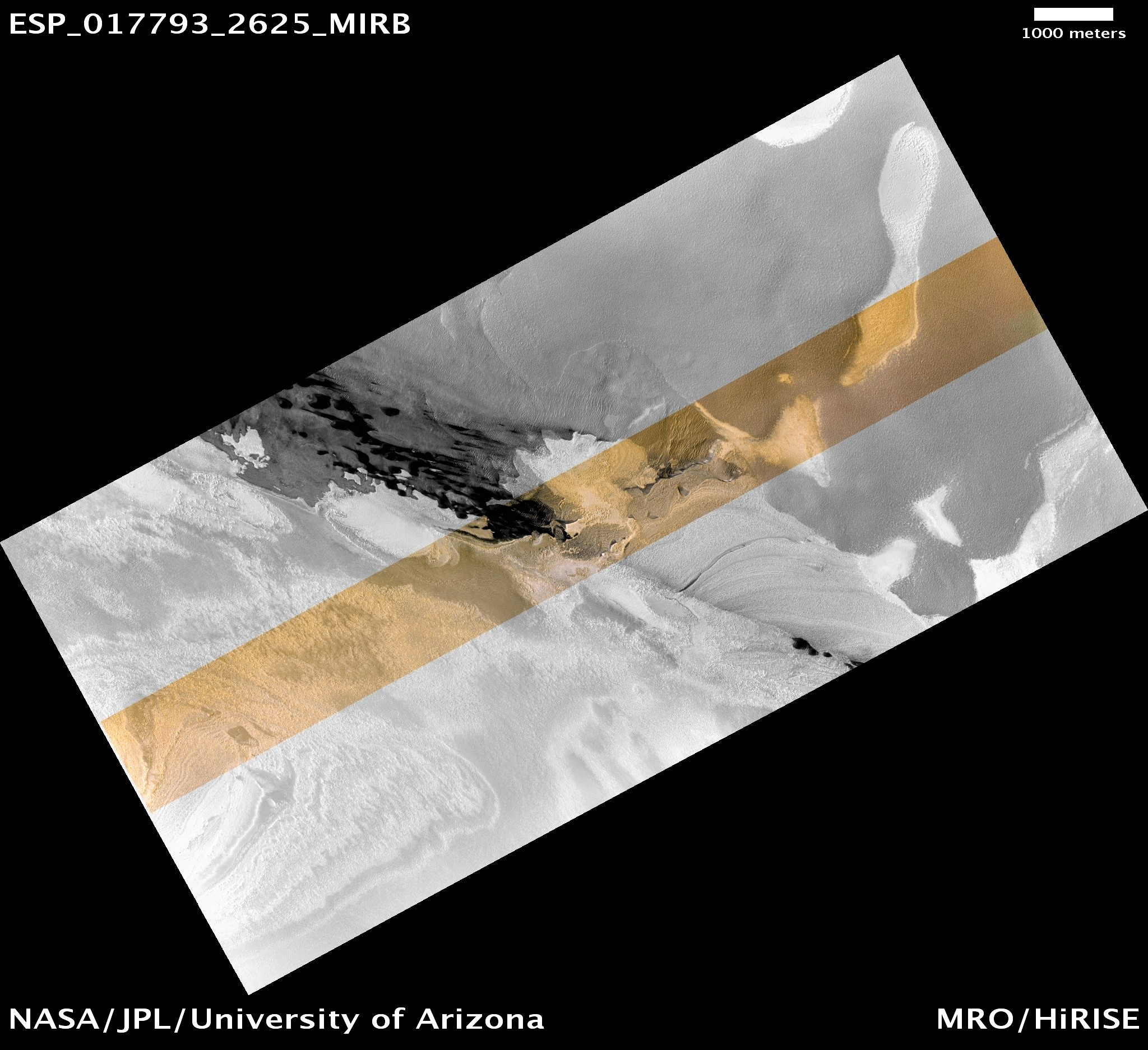
Interaction between Abalos Mensa and Rupes Tenuis dunes

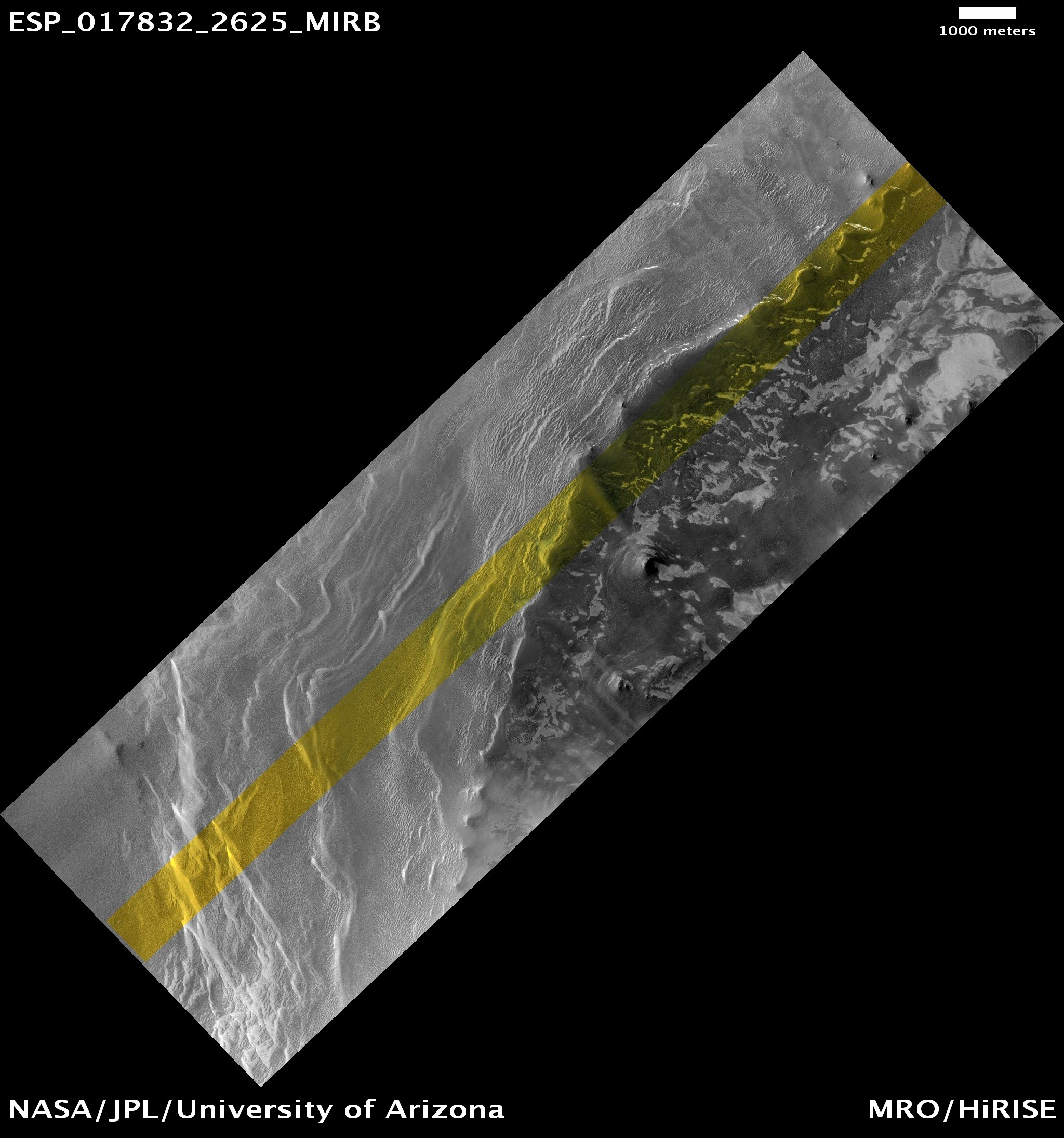
Basal Rupes Tenuis unit exposed north of Abalos Mensa

== See also ==
- Hagal dune field
- Nili Patera dune field
