= Abalos Colles =

Stratified fragment on Mars

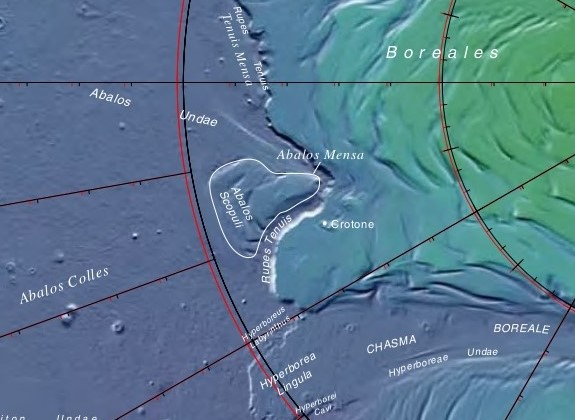
Close-up of USGS map showing the location of Abalos Colles in Planum Boreum in the vicinity of Rupes Tenuis, showing also Abalos Mensa, Abalos Scopuli, and Tenuis Mensa

Abalos Colles (Latin for "Abalos Hills") is a stratified fragment of the Rupes Tenuis basal unit of Planum Boreum, located south of the Rupes Tenuis scarp and west of the Escorial crater. It contains 16 mounds. Abalos Colles is one of the named features in the vicinity of Planum Boreum, the Martian North pole. It is named after one of the classical albedo features on Mars located at latitude 72°N, longitude 70°W. Its name was officially approved by the International Astronomical Union (IAU) in 2003.

It extends from latitude 74.81°N to 78.78°N and from longitude 284.54°E to 293.39°E (66.61°W – 75.46°W). Its centre is located at latitude 71.65°N, longitude 76.83°W, and has a diameter of 235.83 km. The Abalos Colles mounds are of irregular, angular, or conical form. The tops of the conical forms can feature craters, and can also be flat. Their height varies between less than a hundred to less than 700 metres, with top diameters in the range of 20 km. The northernmost boundary of the dune field of Abalos Undae is located in the southwest channel that separates Abalos Colles from the main ice cap, and from there the dune field extends southwest all the way to the lowlands of Vastitas Borealis.

== Formation ==
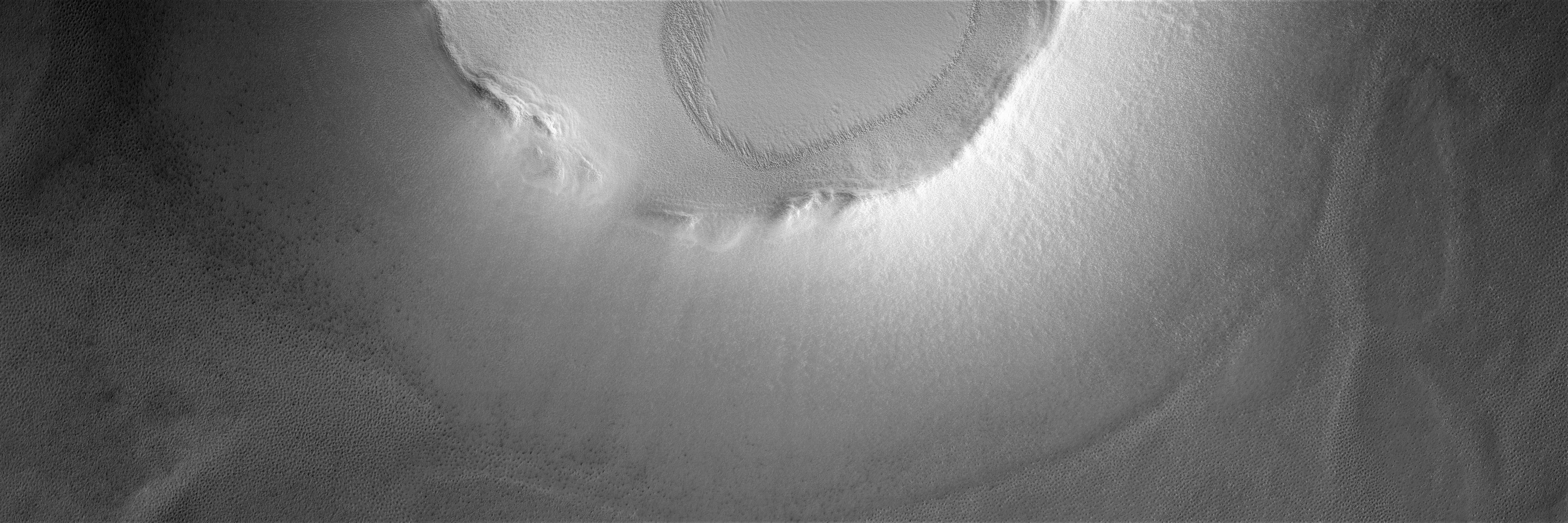
Close-up of an Abalos Colles mound

The Abalos Colles stratigraphy shows similar characteristics with the Rupes Tenuis basal unit, and it is considered a remnant of a larger, contiguous ancient north polar basal unit. The Abalos Colles formation is considered to be the result of large-scale erosion episodes of the Rupes Tenuis basal unit. Probable erosion mechanisms include crater impact which formed ejecta that subsequently covered and protected the ancient basal unit.

Conical mounds with flat or cratered tops could have been formed by layer accumulations on top of impact craters which then eroded to varying degrees, depending on the size of the original crater. At the southern boundary of Chasma Boreale, a sequence of mounds of Abalos Coles with flat, pitted or cratered tops, show similar morphological characteristics to small Icelandic shield volcanoes of basaltic origin. Adjusted to account for the difference in topology between the two planets, both the terrestrial and Martian volcanoes share similar side slopes and volume to diameter ratios, the latter being defined as the volcanic productivity index.

== Images from HiRISE ==
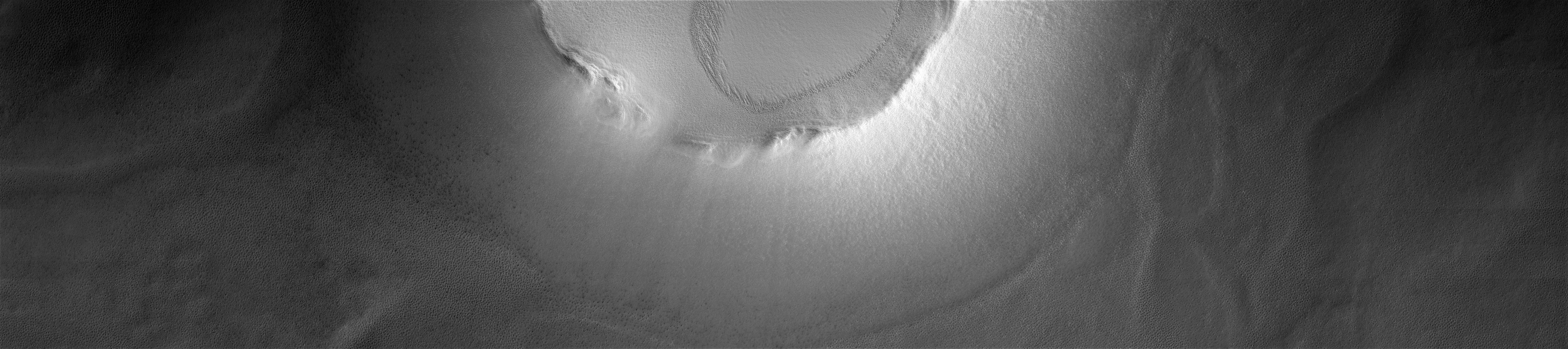
Top view of one of the Abalos Colles mounds with a cratered top.

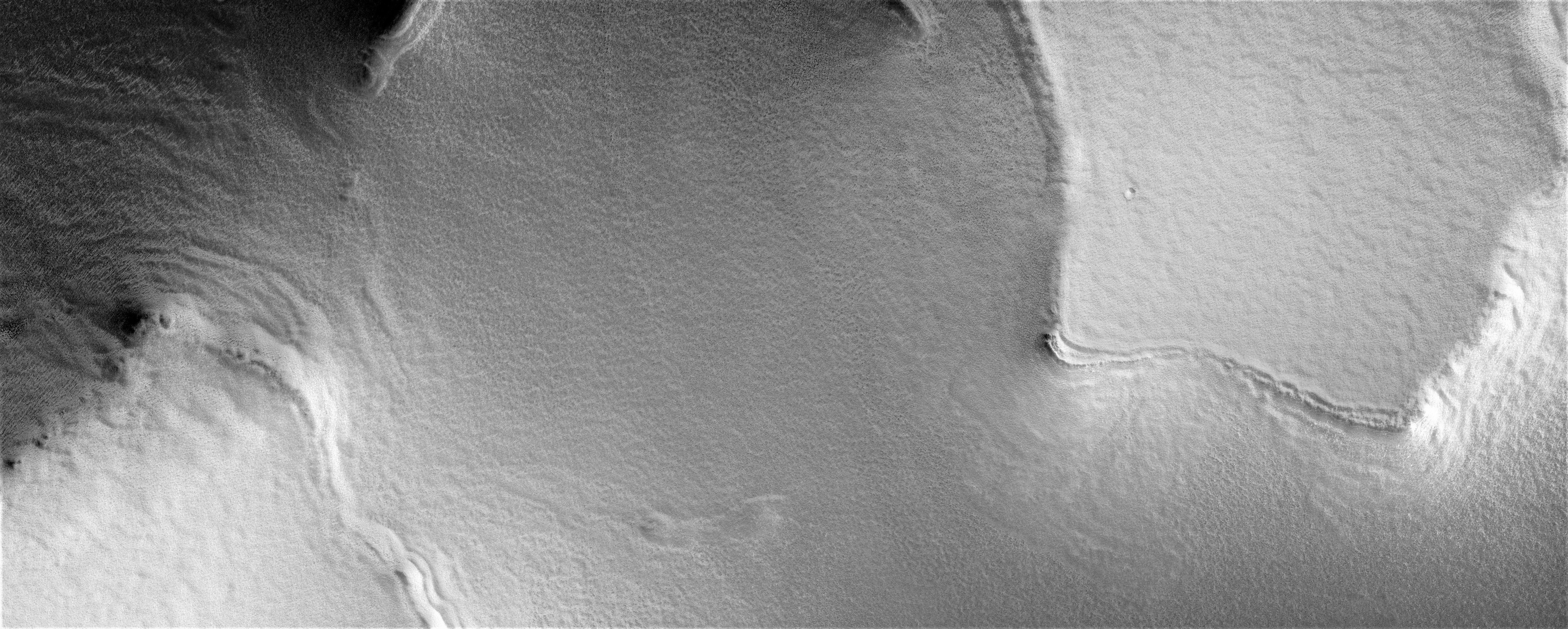
Chasma Borealis - Southern Abalos Colles Region, showing Abalos Colles mounds M4 and M5.

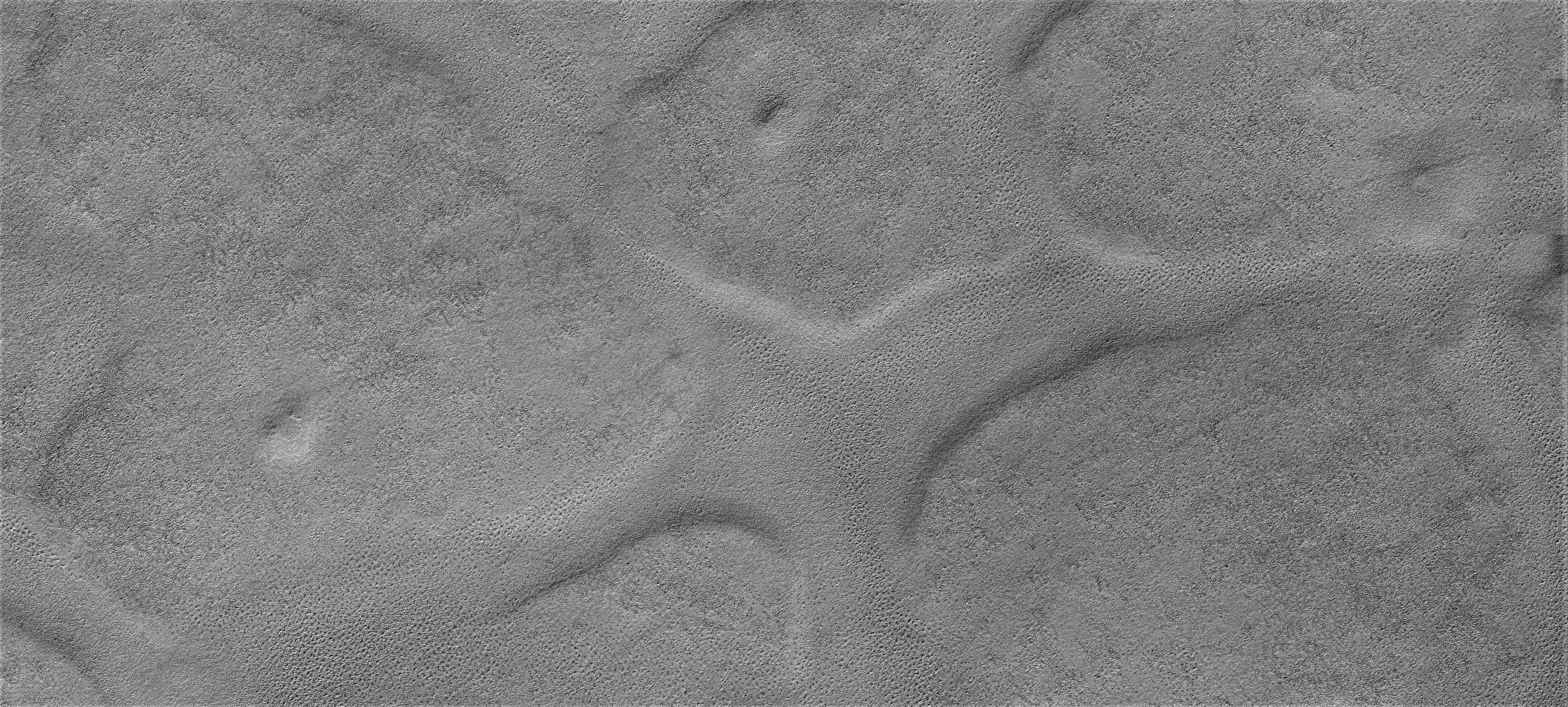
Terrain Near Abalos Colles

== See also ==
- Hagal dune field
- Nili Patera dune field
