= Loay Elbasyouni =

Palestinian-American electrical and computer engineer lead NASA Mars helicopter

- لؤي البسيوني
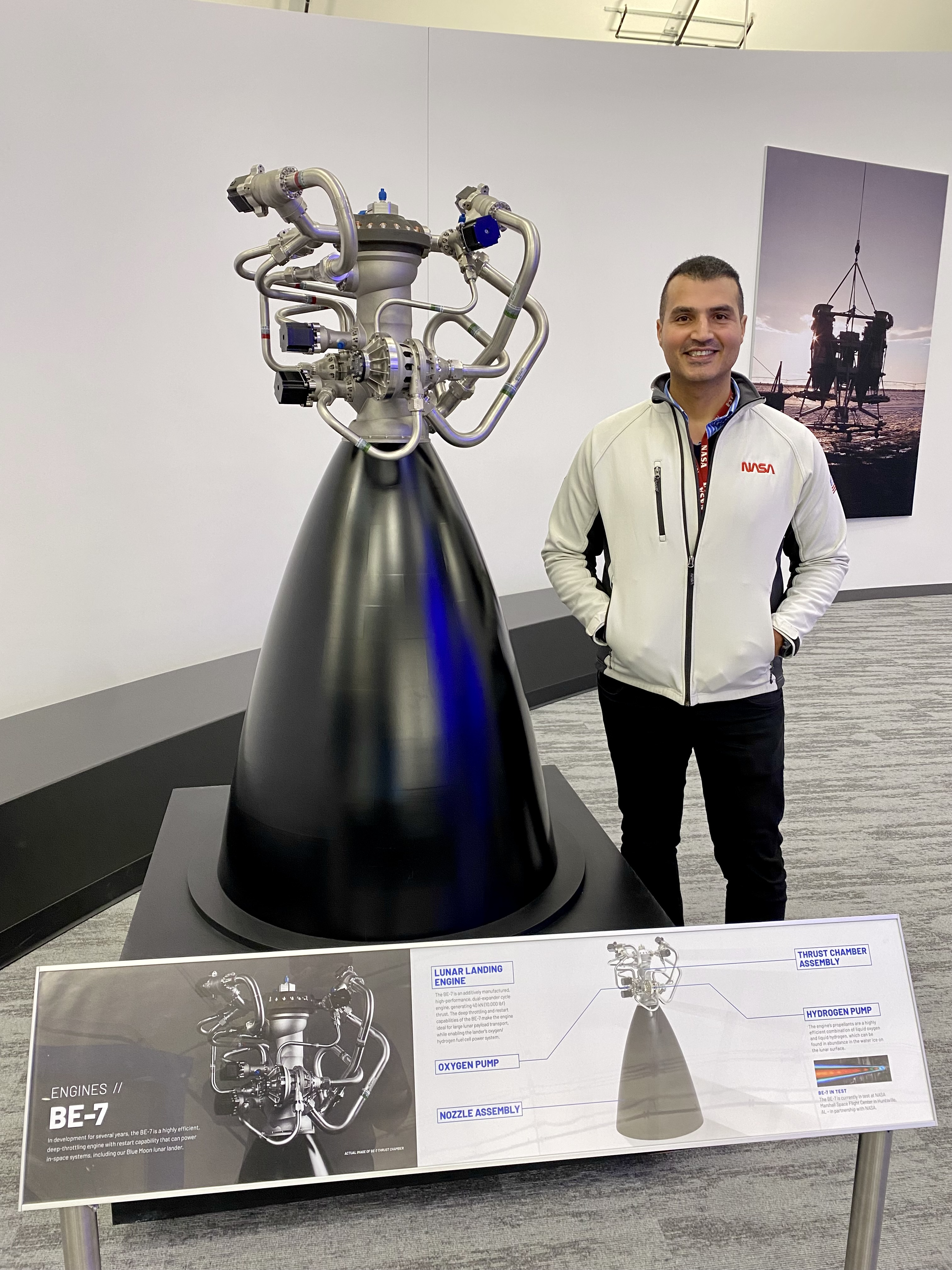
- Elbasyouni in 2023
- Born: Loay Elbasyouni; Germany
- Education: Master of Engineering in Electrical Engineering, University of Louisville (2005); Bachelor of Science in Electrical & Computer Engineering, University of Louisville (2004)
- Alma mater: University of Kentucky, University of Louisville
- Occupations: Electrical engineer, Computer engineer Entrepreneur, Roboticist
- Years active: 2005–present
- Employer(s): NASA, AeroVironment, General Electric, Blue Origin, AstraQua
- Known for: Ingenuity (helicopter), Mars 2020, Blue Moon (spacecraft), Blue Origin rocket engines (BE-7, BE-3U, BE-4, BE-3PM), autonomous robotics
- Notable work: Ingenuity (helicopter), Mars 2020, Azure Transit Connect Electric, Blue Moon (spacecraft), BE-7, BE-3U, BE-4, BE-3PM
- Board member of: Advisory Board, University of California, Riverside
- Parents: Dr. Mohammed El-Basyouni (father); Alya El-Basyouni (mother)
- Awards: NASA Group Achievement Award – for Mars helicopter team; Robert J. Collier Trophy – awarded by the National Aeronautic Association; Howard Hughes Award – for Mars vertical flight innovation; Dr. Robert H. Goddard Memorial Trophy – for extended Ingenuity mission; Michael Collins Trophy – Smithsonian National Air and Space Museum
- Website: www.loay.us www.elbasyouni.com www.astraqua.com

Loay Elbasyouni is a Palestinian-German-American electrical and computer engineer. He helped design the Mars rover Perseverance and was an electrical and power electronics lead in the team that built the Ingenuity helicopter.

== Early life ==
Elbasyouni was born in Germany while his father was studying medicine in that country. He moved to Beit Hanoun in Gaza when he was five years old. He lived through the First Intifada, a period in which the academic year was shortened to as few as eighty days. He attended UNRWA schools during his primary and secondary education. In 1998, he moved to the United States at the age of twenty to continue higher education. He received a master's degree in Electrical engineering from the University of Louisville in 2005. While stargazing from Gaza’s beaches, Elbasyouni dreamed of reaching for the cosmos. "I actually wanted to fly the space shuttle, I just loved anything fast."

== Career ==
After completing his academic training in the United States, Loay Elbasyouni began his engineering career that spans the automotive, aerospace, and space sectors.

Elbasyouni worked on early electric vehicle propulsion systems at General Electric and later contributed to NASA's Mars 2020 mission as a lead electrical engineer. He was a lead engineer in designing the power systems and motor controllers for the Ingenuity Mars Helicopter, which became the first aircraft to achieve powered flight on another planet.

He collaborated with AeroVironment, a key industry partner in the Ingenuity project, contributing to power electronics and system integration.

Following his work on Ingenuity, Elbasyouni joined Jeff Bezos' Blue Origin where he worked on the electrical systems of all major rocket engines, including the BE-7, BE-3U, BE-4, and BE-3PM. These engines power Blue Origin’s New Shepard and New Glenn launch vehicles, as well as the Blue Moon lunar lander selected for NASA’s Artemis V mission. Elbasyouni holds the position of senior manager of electric engine design. In this role, he is engaged in a wide range of projects, including the development of Blue Moon, a lunar lander designed to transport payloads to the surface of the Moon, and New Glenn, a heavy-lift launch vehicle currently undergoing development. He is involved in rocket engines, managing a large team and overseeing the development of avionics the control module that governs the engine's functions. Elbasyouni works with a team that search for water on the moon

In 2012, Elbasyouni began working for a company developing an electric aircraft. In 2014, the company became a contractor for NASA, and Elbasyouni became an electric and power electronics lead for the Mars helicopter team. As of 2023, he works for the Jet Propulsion Laboratory. He has been a member of the team that sent the Perseverance to Mars in March 2020 and a chief engineer for the design team of the Ingenuity robotic helicopter.

In 2024, he founded AstraQua, Inc robotics and AI company. The company specializes in developing autonomous systems for exploration in extreme environments, such as oceans and space. The company aims to bridge the gap between Earth and space exploration by adapting NASA-inspired technologies for scientific research, climate monitoring, and deep-sea exploration.

== Awards ==
Loay Elbasyouni has been recognized with several awards for his contributions to aerospace technology, particularly for his work on NASA’s Mars helicopter team. Here’s a summary of his notable awards:

- NASA Achievement Award (Sep 2018): For his exceptional contribution to the Mars helicopter team, demonstrating the feasibility of helicopter flight in Mars’ thin atmosphere.
- Robert J. Collier Trophy (Jun 2022): Bestowed by The National Aeronautic Association on the team behind NASA’s Ingenuity Mars Helicopter, recognizing their pioneering achievements.
- Howard Hughes Award (May 2022): Recognizes exceptional advancements in vertical flight technology, awarded to the Ingenuity team for their successful flights on Mars.
- Dr. Robert H. Goddard Memorial Trophy: Awarded to the Ingenuity team for groundbreaking space achievements, particularly for the helicopter’s extended mission on Mars.
- Michael Collins Trophy: Presented by The Smithsonian’s National Air and Space Museum for Current Achievement to the Mars Ingenuity Helicopter Team.

here are additional awards and recognitions that Loay Elbasyouni has received:

- UN Secretary-General’s Remarks: UN Secretary-General António Guterres acknowledged Elbasyouni’s journey from UNRWA schools to NASA, highlighting his story as an example of the opportunities created and lives changed through dedication and education.
- UNRWA Commissioner-General’s Praise: Phillipe Lazzarini, the UNRWA Commissioner-General, commended Elbasyouni for his mix of brilliance and bravery, noting his inspirational journey from Gaza to NASA and the impact it has on young refugees and the next generation of scientists

== Professional Affiliations ==
Elbasyouni serves as an Advisory Board Member for the University of California, Riverside Extension’s Executive Education program, supporting leadership development through innovation and technology.

He is a Sr. member of the Institute of Electrical and Electronics Engineers (IEEE), actively participating in initiatives related to aerospace, AI, and sustainability.

== STEM Advocacy and Mentorship ==
Elbasyouni is committed to advancing STEM education and frequently shares his journey to inspire students and young professionals worldwide. He mentors aspiring engineers and promotes innovation through public talks and community engagement.

== Public Speaking Engagements ==
Elbasyouni has delivered keynotes and participated in panels at global institutions, including the MIT Alumni Association, the NYU Abu Dhabi Hackathon for Social Good, and Istanbul Technical University.

He has also spoken at IEEE events and SETA TechTalks on artificial intelligence and space technologies.

He was also featured on the Lexicon podcast by Interesting Engineering, where he discussed his journey and NASA’s Mars Helicopter mission.

== Media Coverage ==
Elbasyouni's engineering achievements and personal journey have been featured in international media. The Los Angeles Times profiled his role in NASA’s Mars 2020 Perseverance Rover mission, including the design of the Ingenuity helicopter.

He has also appeared in interviews and features on the BBC World Service, BBC, and BBC The Documentary Podcast.

His work has been highlighted by Wired Middle East in a feature on engineers contributing to space exploration, and by Interesting Engineering for his involvement in the Ingenuity Mars Helicopter project.

He was also featured on StoryCorps, sharing his journey, and the Inside Story Podcast from iHeartRadio.

== Personal life ==
Elbasyouni lives in Los Angeles, California. He has not returned to Palestine since 2000 due to instability in the region. His elderly parents were trapped in Gaza during the recent conflict. Mohammed and Alya Elbasyouni, who had been visiting Gaza, were caught in the escalating violence and unable to leave due to their health and mobility issues.

As the situation in Gaza worsened, Loay, from his home in Los Angeles, made desperate efforts to secure their evacuation. The couple endured severe shortages of food and water, and constant bombardment, which exacerbated Mohammed's heart condition. Loay coordinated with various organizations and officials, trying multiple avenues to get his parents out safely.

After numerous attempts and a failed initial evacuation that came under fire, Loay succeeded with the assistance of Turkish authorities. His parents were transported in an ambulance convoy to the Rafah border crossing, which was the only viable exit from Gaza at the time. Despite the danger and challenges, they eventually crossed into Egypt and reunited with Loay in Turkey.

Loay compared his success on Mars and inability to help his parent at start "I feel like I’m part of the Wright Brother team, like, who flew the first time on Earth. It’s an incredible feeling to have contributed to making history in space, yet it’s a stark contrast to the inability to help my own family back in Gaza."

== See also ==
- Munther A. Dahleh
