= Mars Sample Recovery Helicopter =

NASA helicopters on the Mars Sample recovery Lander mission

- Part of NASA-ESA Mars Sample Return
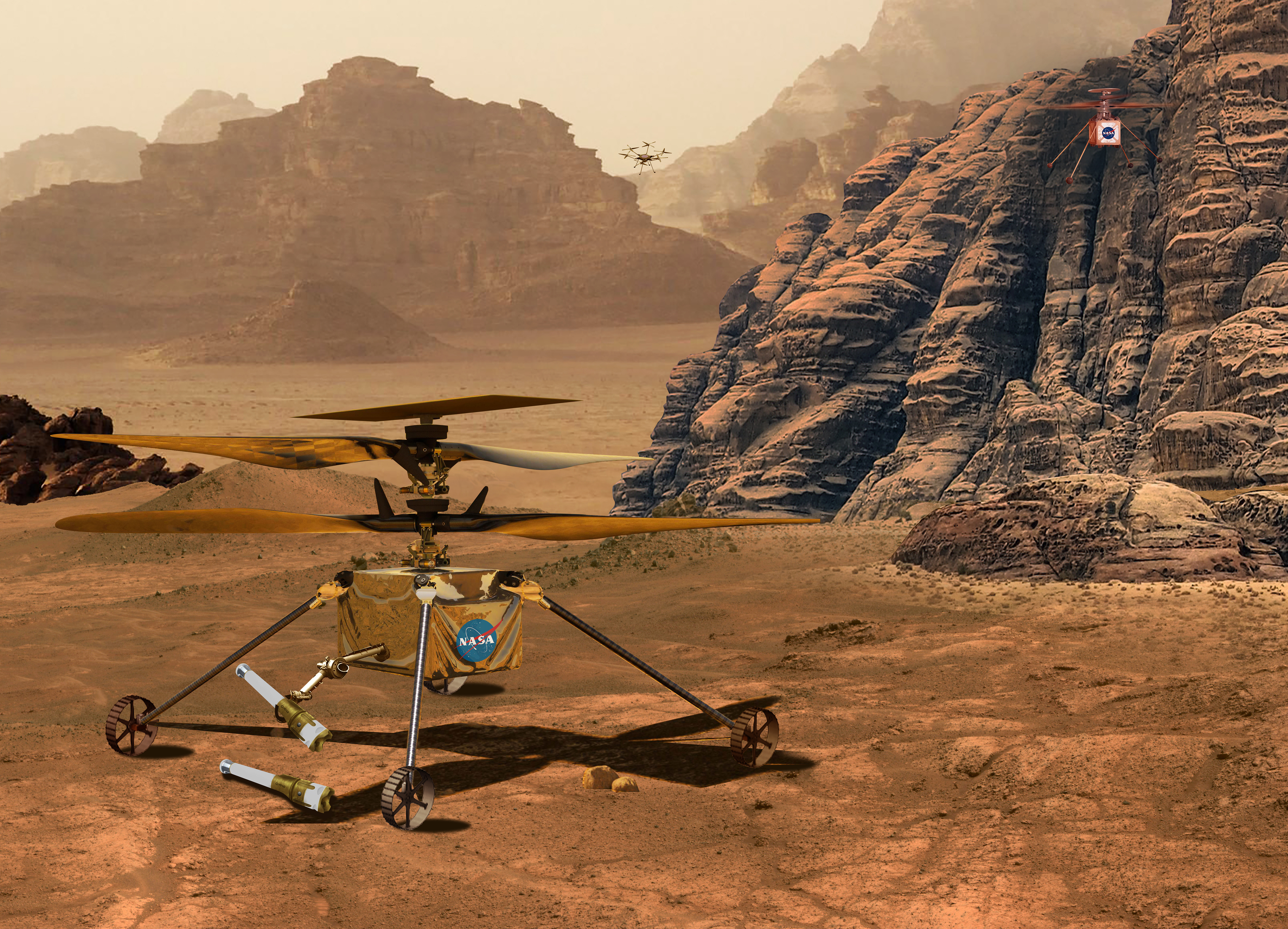
- Artist's drawing showing one of the Mars Sample Recovery Helicopters collecting Mars 2020 sample tubes from depot while Mars Science Helicopter and Ingenuity are seen flying over Mars
- Type: Extraterrestrial autonomous UAV helicopter
- Owner: NASA
- Manufacturer: Jet Propulsion Laboratory

Specifications
- Dimensions: 131 cm × 49 cm × 52 cm (52 in × 19 in × 20 in)
- Dry mass: 2.26 kg (5.0 lb)
- Power: 6 Solar-charged Sony VTC-4 Li ion batteries; typical engine input power: 350 watt

History
- Deployed: 2030; from Mars Sample Retrieval Lander (SRL) (planned); Maximum speed: 18 km/h (11 mph, 9.7 kn); Range: 0.700 km (0.435 mi, 0.378 nmi); Service ceiling: 20 m (66 ft); Rate of climb: 5.5 m/s (1,080 ft/min); Rate of sink: 1 m/s (200 ft/min)

NASA Mars helicopters

The Mars Sample Recovery Helicopters are a pair of robotic unmanned helicopters being developed by the engineers of the American company AeroVironment Inc. and proposed in March 2022 as a means of delivering Martian soil samples from the sample depots made by the Perseverance rover to the location of the Sample Retrieval Lander (SRL) that will load these samples onto the Mars Ascent Vehicle (MAV), which, in accordance with the NASA-ESA Mars Sample Return program, will deliver them to low Martian orbit for future return to Earth.

In January 2024, a related proposed NASA plan had been challenged due to budget and scheduling considerations, and a newer overhaul plan undertaken.

== Background of the project ==
While the Perseverance rover collects and caches samples on Mars, scientists and technicians at JPL are developing helicopters that will retrieve them. The plan flashed in June 2022, when MSR campaign needed a helicopter to recover sample tubes this brought the sample recovery helicopters into play.

=== Design ===
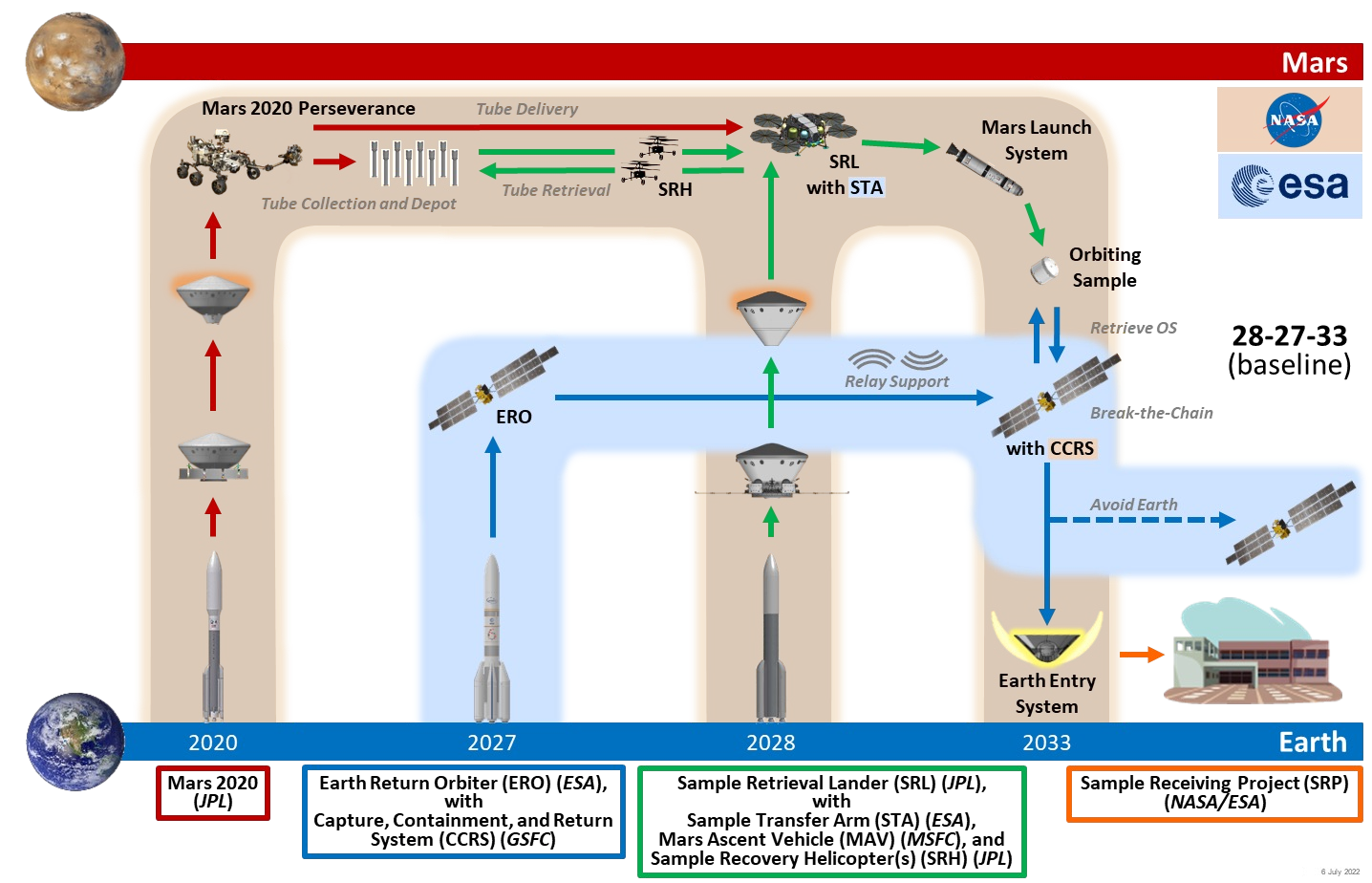
Mars sample return architecture revised

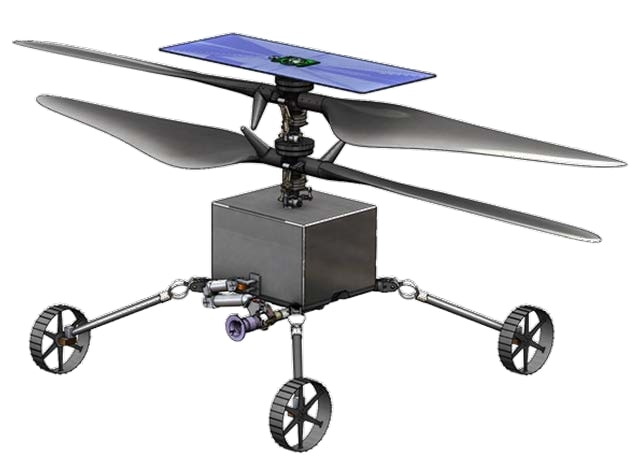
Mars sample return helicopter concept

The Martian Sample recovery helicopters are being developed by AeroVironment, Inc. based on technology they previously demonstrated on the Ingenuity coaxial helicopter as a part of NASA's Perseverance rover. Unlike the Ingenuity "technology demonstrator", the Sample Return Helicopters will have ~10 centimetres (3.9 in) longer rotors with 3500 rpm, will have a payload capacity of 280 g (9.9 oz), a small manipulator arm with a two-fingered gripper, and self-propelled, wheeled landing gear (each being ~2 cm (0.79 in) wide, with an outer diameter of ~10 cm (3.9 in)), enabling them to roll up, grab a sample, and fly to the return vehicle.

Key components were modified based on lessons learned from Ingenuity. Flight aspects, including speed, flight time, range are the same as it is on Ingenuity. The power-to-weight ratio of the device will increase, for which the area of the solar panel and the capacity of the batteries will be increased. The control system of the upper screw will be somewhat simplified, and the engine power will increase. The overall dimensions of the helicopter will be slightly larger. In total, it is planned to send two such machines to Mars. Along with this, high performance processors enabling autonomy, unprecedented mobility through both flying and driving, and a true manipulation capability with a robot hand, can enable much more than sample tube retrieval.

A Sample Recovery Helicopter model testing its wheels, an element absent in Ingenuity

The helicopters will have a range of 700 m (2,300 ft), but plans call for the lander to be within 50 m (160 ft) of the "depot" where the samples will be deposited. Each sample tube is about 150 grams.

=== Concept ===
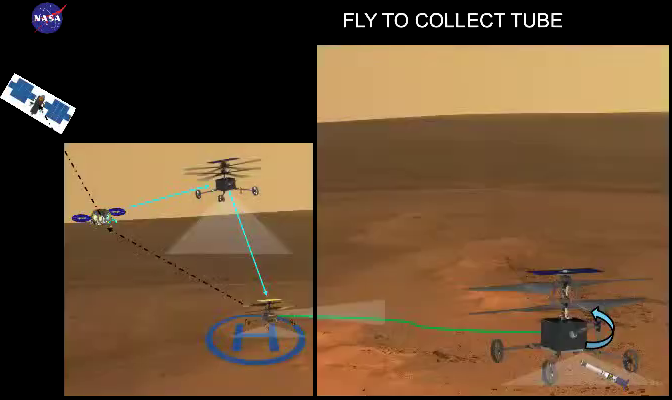
An artist's impression of an Ingenuity-class sample retriever campaign

The intermediate transportation of the collected samples on the surface of Mars was initially undertaken by the European Space Agency (ESA), which included this project in its ExoMars program. The Mars 2020 mission landed the Perseverance rover, which is storing samples to be returned to Earth later. However, due to repeated postponements, already in November 2021, NASA came to the need to postpone the delivery of samples and assess the risks inherent in the delivery scheme itself in July 2022. The decision was based on the success of Ingenuity.

The NASA-ESA Mars Sample Return mission will not include the ESA Sample Fetch Rover and its associated second lander, but instead use a single lander carrying the helicopters and the ascent rocket that will take the samples to an orbiter, from where they will be launched back to Earth. Mission planners intend that Perseverance itself will retrieve samples that it previously cached on the surface and drive them to the ascent rocket, given its expected longevity. The helicopters, which will be slightly heavier than Ingenuity, would be used as a backup if Perseverance would be unable to perform the task.

=== Sample retrieval process ===
Recovering a sample will span over four sols (Martian day). On the first sol, it will fly from the vicinity of SRL to a landing site a few meters away from a sample tube. On the next sol, the helicopter will drive to that tube and grab it using its tiny robotic arm. On the third sol, it will return to SRL, and on the last of the four sols its drives into position and releases the sample tube so that the lander's ESA-built sample transfer arm can place the tube onto the sample return canister on board the Mars Ascent Vehicle placed on its deck.

The Sample Recovery Helicopters would take off and land at predetermined sites, or helipads, that have been found suitable and safe, and would use in-flight, map-based navigation to reach the known locations of sample tubes left on the surface.
