= Ingenuity (helicopter) =

Retired NASA helicopter on the Mars 2020 mission

- Part of Mars 2020
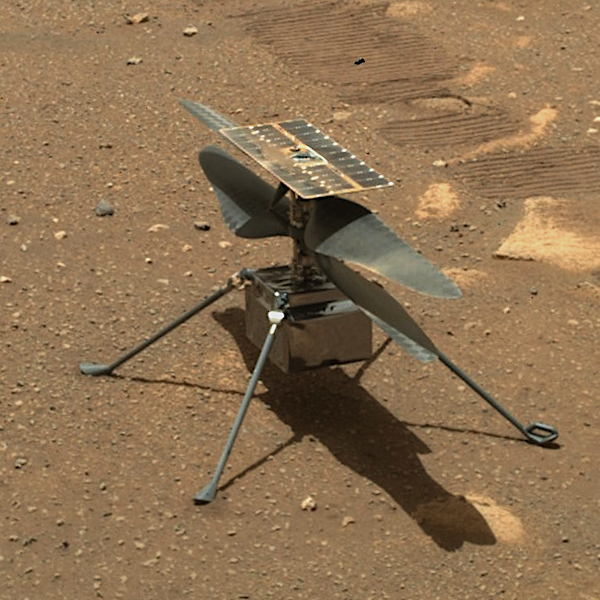
- Ingenuity at Wright Brothers Field on 6 April 2021, its third day of deployment on Mars
- Type: Extraterrestrial autonomous UAV helicopter
- Serial no.: IGY (civil registration)
- Owner: NASA
- Manufacturer: Jet Propulsion Laboratory

Specifications
- Dimensions: 121 cm × 49 cm × 52 cm (48 in × 19 in × 20 in)
- Dry mass: 1.8 kilograms (4.0 lb)
- Communication: Zigbee transponder with base station on Perseverance
- Power: 6 Solar-charged Sony VTC4 Li-ion batteries; typical motor input power: 350 watt

Instruments
- Cameras × 2; Inertial sensors; Laser altimeter

History
- Deployed: 3 April 2021; from Perseverance
- First flight: 19 April 2021, 07:34 UTC (to and from Wright Brothers Field)
- Last flight: 18 January 2024 (to and from Airfield Chi (χ) in Valinor Hills)
- Flights: 72
- Flight time: 2 hr 8 min 48 sec, cumulative
- Travelled: Horizontal: 17.242 km (10.714 mi) on Mars; Vertical: max. 24 m (79 ft); Data from NASA Mars Helicopter Flight Log: Maximum speed: 36.0 km/h (22.4 mph, 19.4 kn)
- Fate: Grounded permanently due to rotor blade damage
- Location: Jezero crater, Mars

NASA Mars helicopters

Ingenuity, nicknamed Ginny, is an autonomous helicopter that operated on Mars from 2021 to 2024 as part of NASA's Mars 2020 mission. Ingenuity made its first flight on 19 April 2021, demonstrating that flight is possible in the extremely thin atmosphere of Mars, and became the first aircraft to conduct a powered and controlled extraterrestrial flight. (Note: It was the third aircraft overall ever to fly on a planet besides Earth—the first two were balloon probes of the Soviet Union's Vega 1 and 2, which conducted unpowered flight in the atmosphere of Venus. Both balloons flew from 11 to 13 and 15 to 17 of June 1985 respectively.) It was designed by NASA's Jet Propulsion Laboratory (JPL) in collaboration with AeroVironment, NASA's Ames Research Center and Langley Research Center with components supplied by Lockheed Martin Space, Qualcomm, and SolAero.

Ingenuity was delivered to Mars on 18 February 2021, attached to the underside of the Perseverance rover, which landed at the Octavia E. Butler Landing site near the western rim of the 45 km-wide (28 mi) Jezero crater. Because radio signals take several minutes to travel between Earth and Mars, it could not be manually controlled in real time, and instead autonomously flew flight plans sent to it by JPL.

Originally intended to make only five flights, Ingenuity completed 72 flights over the course of nearly three years. The five originally planned flights were part of a 30-sol technology demonstration intended to prove its airworthiness with flights of up to 90 seconds at altitudes ranging from 3 to 5 meters (10 to 16 ft). Following this demonstration, JPL designed a series of operational flights to explore how aerial scouts could help explore Mars and other worlds. In this operational role, Ingenuity scouted areas of interest for the Perseverance rover, improved navigational techniques, and explored the limits of its flight envelope. Ingenuity's performance and resilience in the harsh Martian environment greatly exceeded expectations, allowing it to perform far more flights than were initially planned. On 18 January 2024, the rotor blades were broken during landing on flight 72, permanently grounding the helicopter. NASA announced the end of the mission one week later. Engineers concluded that Ingenuity's navigation system was not effective over the featureless terrain on the final flight, resulting in a crash landing. By the end of its mission, Ingenuity had flown for a total of 2 hours, 8 minutes and 48 seconds over 1,004 days, covering more than 17 kilometers (11 mi).

== Development ==
=== Concept ===
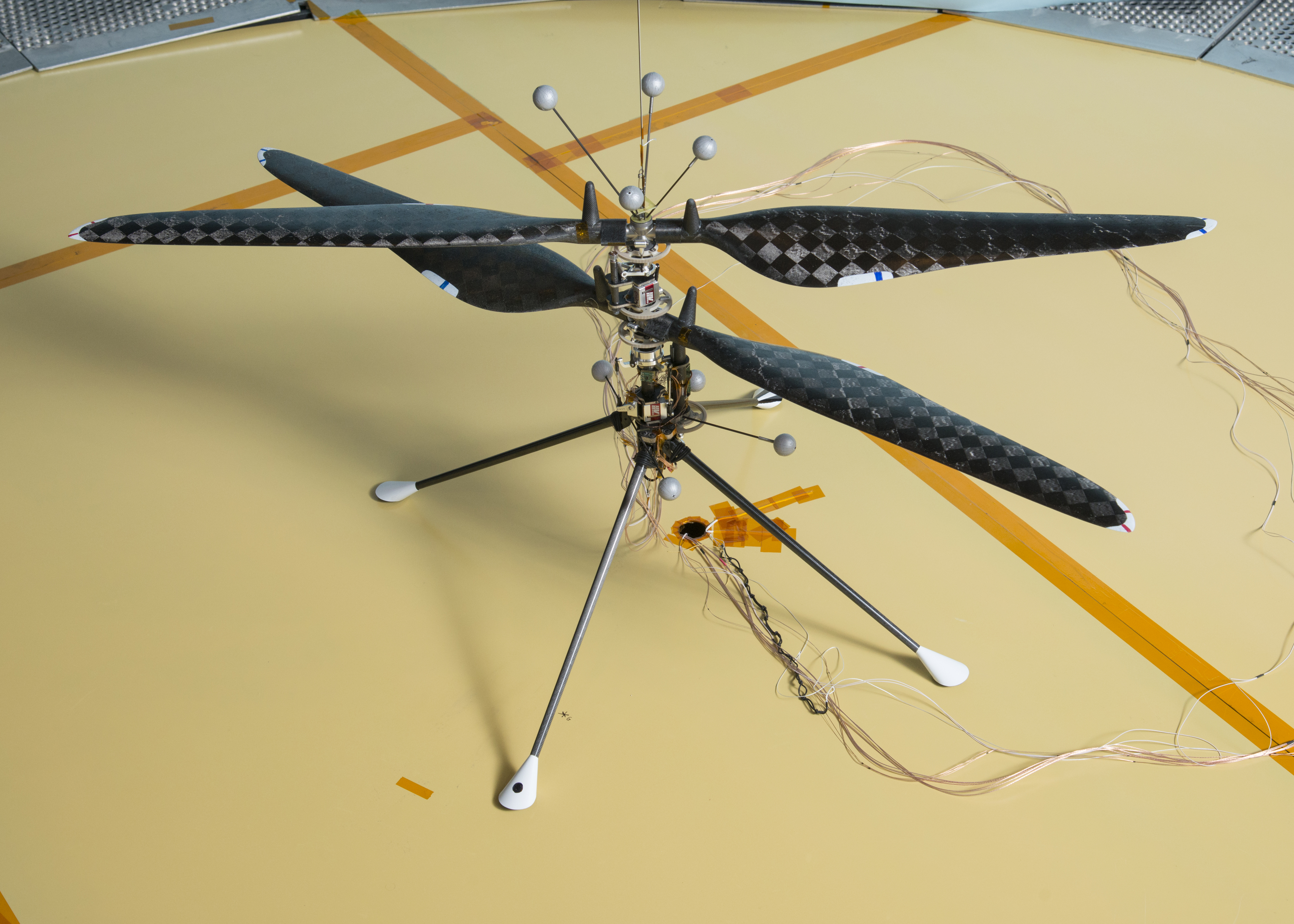
Prototype Mars helicopter, which first flew in a pressure chamber simulating the Martian atmosphere on 31 May 2016

The development of the project that would eventually become Ingenuity started in 2012 when JPL director Charles Elachi visited the lab's Autonomous Systems Division, which had done relevant concept work. By January 2015, NASA agreed to fund the development of a full-size model, which came to be known as the "risk reduction" vehicle. NASA's JPL and AeroVironment published the conceptual design in 2014 for a scout helicopter to accompany a rover. By mid-2016, $15 million was being requested to continue development of the helicopter.

By December 2017, engineering models of the vehicle had been tested in a simulated Martian atmosphere. Models were undergoing testing in the Arctic, but its inclusion in the mission had not yet been approved or funded.

=== Mission integration ===
When the Mars 2020 program was approved in July 2014, a helicopter flight demonstration was neither included nor budgeted.

The United States federal budget, announced in March 2018, provided $23 million for the helicopter for one year, and it was announced on 11 May 2018, that the helicopter could be developed and tested in time to be included in the Mars 2020 mission. The helicopter underwent extensive flight-dynamics and environment testing, and was mounted on the underside of the Perseverance rover in August 2019. NASA spent about $80 million to build Ingenuity and about $5 million to operate the helicopter.

In 2019, preliminary designs of Ingenuity were tested on Earth in simulated Mars atmospheric and gravity conditions. For flight testing, a large vacuum chamber was used to simulate the very low pressure of the atmosphere of Mars—filled with carbon dioxide to about 0.60% (about 1/160) of standard atmospheric pressure at sea level on Earth—which is roughly equivalent to a helicopter flying at 34,000 m (112,000 ft) altitude in the atmosphere of Earth. In order to simulate the much-reduced gravity field of Mars (38% of Earth's), 62% of Earth's gravity was offset by a line pulling upwards during flight tests. A "wind-wall" consisting of almost 900 computer fans was used to provide wind in the chamber.

In April 2020, the vehicle was named Ingenuity by Vaneeza Rupani, a girl in the 11th grade at Tuscaloosa County High School in Northport, Alabama, who submitted an essay into NASA's "Name the Rover" contest. Known in planning stages as the Mars Helicopter Scout, or simply the Mars Helicopter, the nickname Ginny later entered use in parallel to the parent rover Perseverance being affectionately referred to as Percy. Its full-scale engineering model for testing on Earth was named Earth Copter and, unofficially, Terry.

Ingenuity was designed to be a technology demonstrator by JPL to assess whether such a vehicle could fly safely. Before it was built, launched and landed, scientists and managers expressed hope that helicopters could provide better mapping and guidance that would give future mission controllers more information to help with travel routes, planning, and hazard avoidance. Based on the performance of previous rovers through Curiosity, it was assumed that such aerial scouting might enable future rovers to safely drive up to three times as far per sol. However, the new AutoNav capability of Perseverance significantly reduced this advantage, allowing the rover to cover more than 100 meters per sol.

=== Development team ===
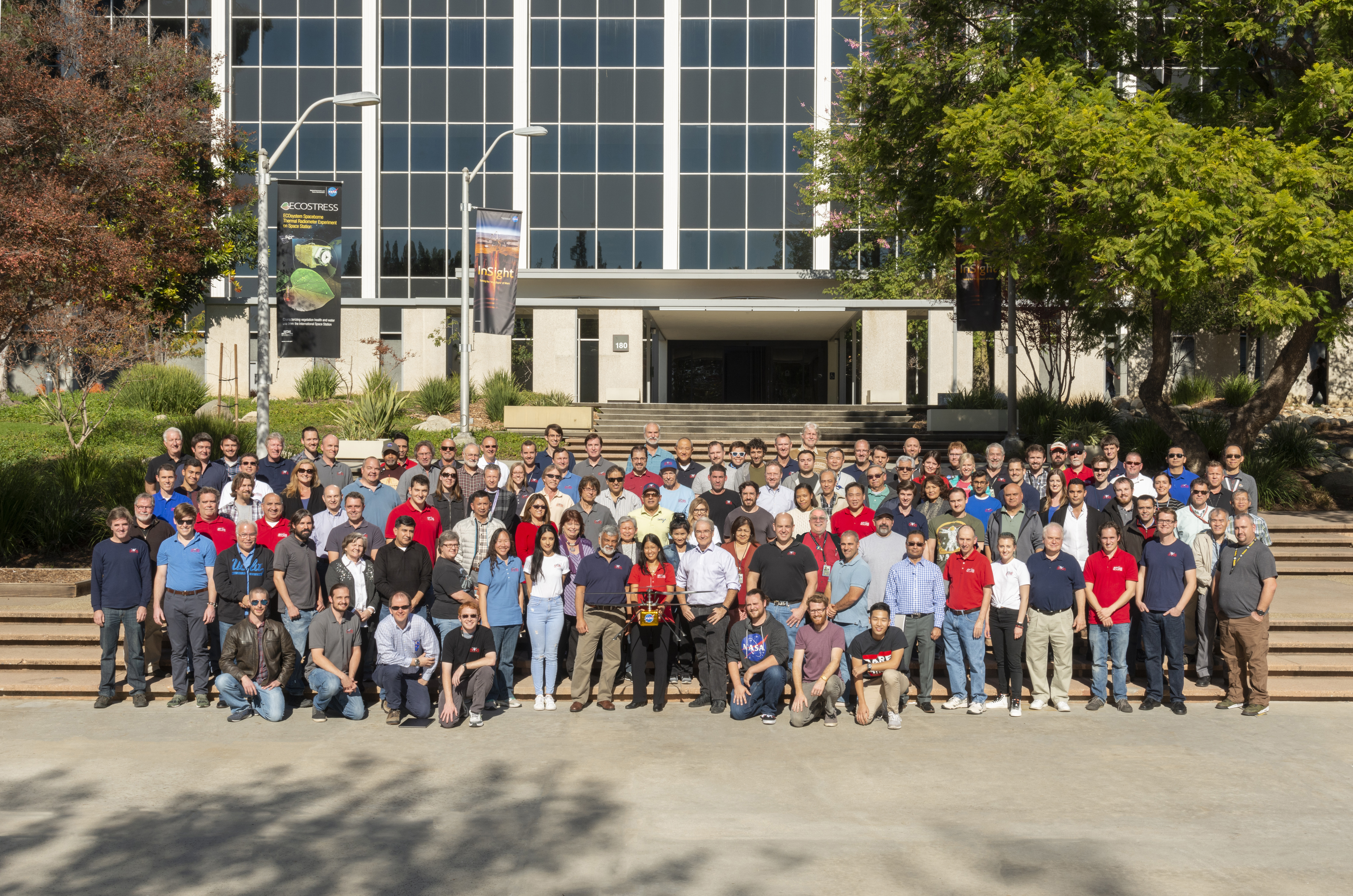
Ingenuity team, 2018

The Ingenuity team was comparatively small, with never more than 65 full-time-equivalent employees from JPL. Program workers from AeroVironment, NASA AMES and Langley research centers brought the total to 150. Key personnel include:

- MiMi Aung – Ingenuity Mars Helicopter Project Manager at NASA's Jet Propulsion Laboratory,
- Bob Balaram – Chief Engineer (prior to Nov 2021)
- Timothy Canham – Flight Software Lead and Operations Lead (prior to June 2021)
- Håvard Fjær Grip – GNC Lead and Chief Pilot
- Matt Keennon – AeroVironment Technical Lead
- Loay Elbasyouni – Lead Electrical and Power Electronics Engineer.
- Ben Pipenberg – AeroVironment Design Lead
- Chris Bang - AeroVironment Mars Helicopter Program Manager
- Josh Ravich – Mechanical Engineering Lead
- Teddy Tzanetos – Operations Lead
- Nacer Chahat – Antenna Engineer and Telecom System Engineering

On 15 June 2021, the team behind Ingenuity was named the 2021 winner of the John L. "Jack" Swigert Jr. Award for Space Exploration from the Space Foundation. On 5 April 2022, the National Aeronautic Association awarded Ingenuity and its group in JPL the 2021 Collier Trophy.

== Opposition ==
The idea to include a helicopter in the Mars 2020 mission was opposed by several NASA leaders, scientists and JPL employees. Up until the end of the 2010s, they argued against integrating a helicopter into the mission. For three years, the future Ingenuity was developed outside the Mars 2020 project and its budget. Although NASA management accepted assurances in the spring of 2018 that the addition of a helicopter would not harm the goals of the expedition, Mars 2020 chief scientist Kenneth Farley stated; "I have personally been opposed to it because we are working very hard for efficiencies and spending 30 days working on a technology demonstration does not further those goals directly from the science point of view". Farley was convinced that the helicopter was a distraction from the priority scientific tasks, unacceptable even for a short time.

Comparison of total distance traveled by Ingenuity and Perseverance (Note: Flights 1, 2 and 14 are not seen because they include little, if any, horizontal displacement.)

The skepticism on the part of NASA leadership was not unfounded. Scientists, engineers and managers proceeded from a pragmatic comparison of the benefits of additional aerial reconnaissance with the costs that inevitably fall on the schedule for the rover to complete all the tasks assigned to it. During a live stream from NASA, MiMi Aung, the Ingenuity Project Manager, and Jennifer Trosper discussed the value of Ingenuity. Trosper argued that the Perseverance rover would outpace the helicopter due to its auto-navigation capability, thus negating one of central arguments for the value to the mission of the helicopter. At the end of the test window, NASA extended support for Ingenuity for another 30 sols, limiting the frequency of departures to one flight every few weeks.

On 14 June 2021, the Director of the Mars Exploration program, E. Janson, and the Principal Mars Explorer, M. Meyer, directly addressed all the staff of the Mars 2020 project. During this address they cautioned the staff to keep their Ingenuity enthusiasm in check, and concentrate on collecting samples. On the same date, in their report to the Planetary Advisory Committee (PAC), the helicopter was mentioned only in the past tense, e.g. "...placed Ingenuity and completed the technology demonstration phase...". Despite this early pessimism, Ingenuity proved to be more than capable of keeping up with Perseverance, actually staying ahead of the rover for the majority of the traverse up the Jezero delta.

During the latter half of 2022, insufficient solar energy during the Martian winter hampered the operations of Ingenuity due to the lack of solar power, causing the helicopter to entirely shut down at night. While the system allowing it to restart after complete power loss worked as intended, Ingenuity struggled to follow Perseverance as it was unable to carry out long flights.

== Design ==
=== Mechanical design ===
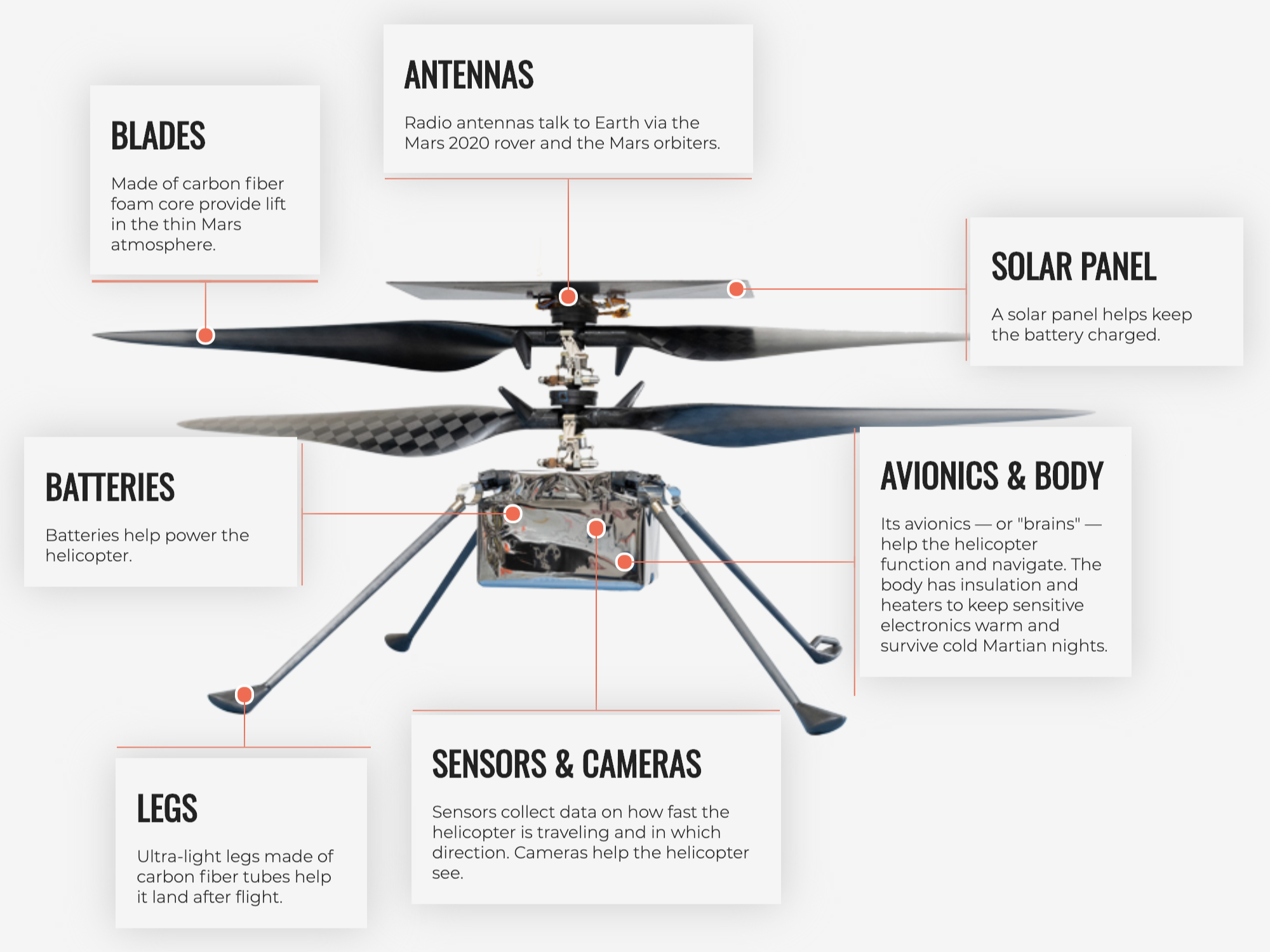
The main components of Ingenuity

Ingenuity consists of a rectangular fuselage measuring 136 mm × 195 mm × 163 mm (5.4 in × 7.7 in × 6.4 in) suspended below a pair of coaxial contra-rotating rotors measuring 1.21 m (4 ft) in diameter. This assembly is supported by four landing legs of 384 mm (15.1 in) each. It also carries a solar array mounted above the rotors to recharge its batteries. The entire vehicle is 0.49 m (1 ft 7 in) tall.

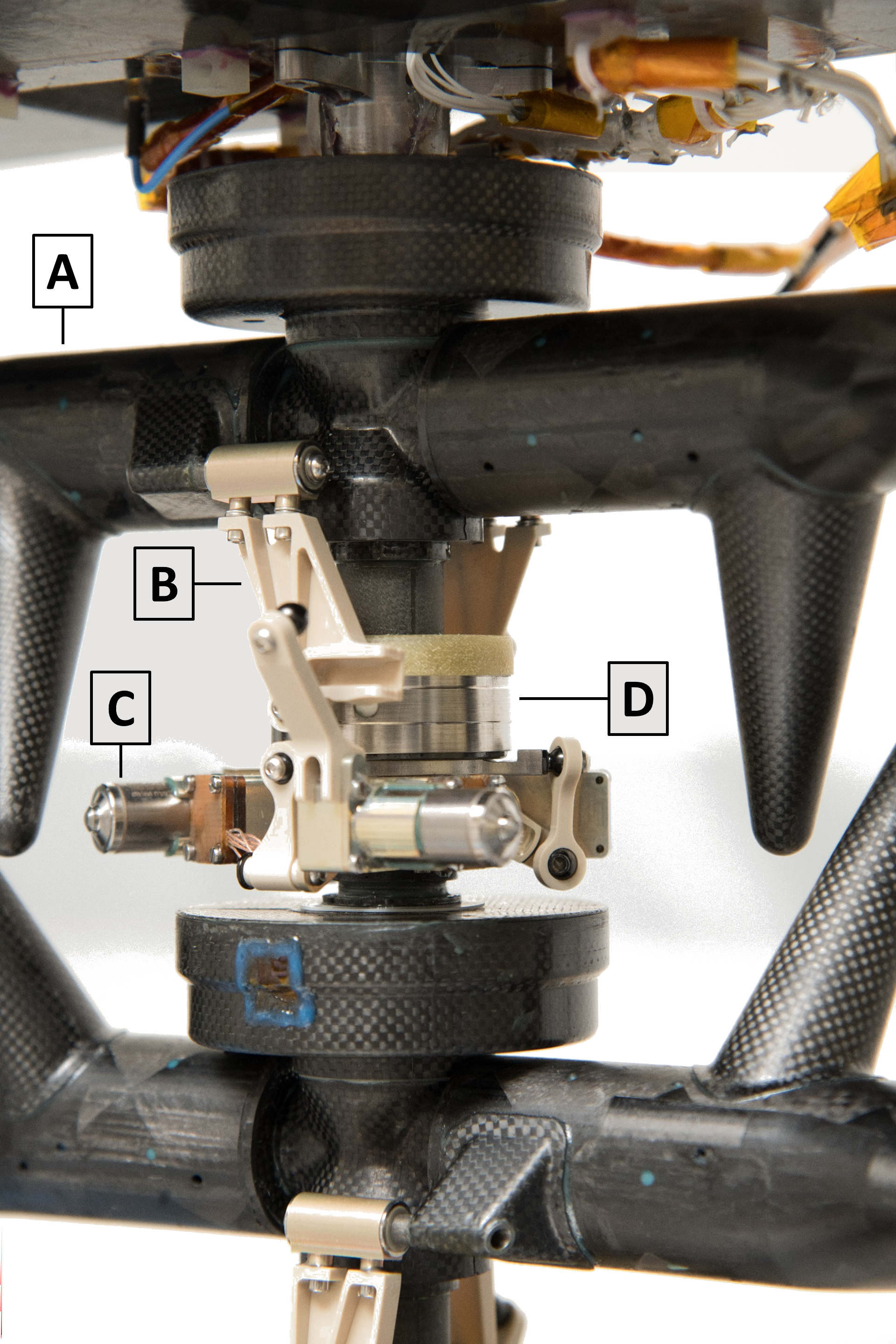
Ingenuity upper swashplate assembly A – Rotor blade; B – Pitch link; C – Servo; D – Swashplate

The lower gravity of Mars (about a third of Earth's) only partially offsets the thinness of the 95% carbon dioxide atmosphere of Mars, making it much harder for an aircraft to generate adequate lift. The planet's atmospheric density is about 1/100 that of Earth's at sea level, or about the same as at 27,000 m (87,000 ft), an altitude never reached by existing helicopters. This density reduces even more in Martian winters. To keep Ingenuity aloft, its specially shaped blades of enlarged size must rotate between 2400 and 2900 rpm, or about 10 times faster than what is needed on Earth. Each of the helicopter's contra-rotating coaxial rotors is controlled by a separate swashplate that can affect both collective and cyclic pitch. Ingenuity was also constructed to spacecraft specifications to withstand the acceleration and vibrations during launch and Mars landing without damage.

=== Avionics ===
Ingenuity relies on different sensor packages grouped in two assemblies. All sensors are commercial off-the-shelf units.

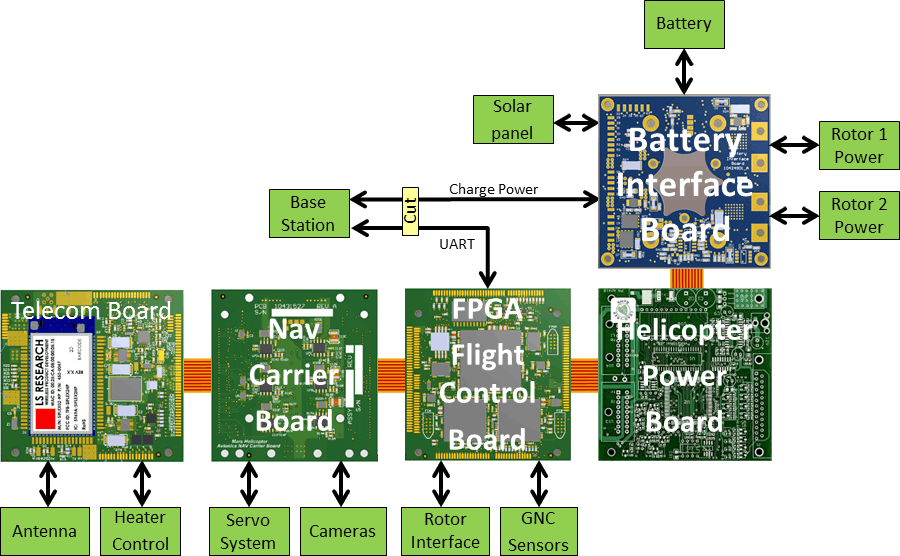
Internal hardware architecture of Ingenuity

The Upper Sensor Assembly, with associated vibration isolation elements, is mounted on the mast close to the vehicle's center-of-mass to minimize the effects of angular rates and accelerations. It consists of a cellphone-grade Bosch BMI-160 inertial measurement unit (IMU) and an inclinometer (Murata SCA100T-D02); the inclinometer is used to calibrate the IMU while on the ground prior to flight. The Lower Sensor Assembly consists of an altimeter (Garmin LIDAR Lite v3), cameras, and a secondary IMU, all mounted directly on the Electronics Core Module (not on the mast).

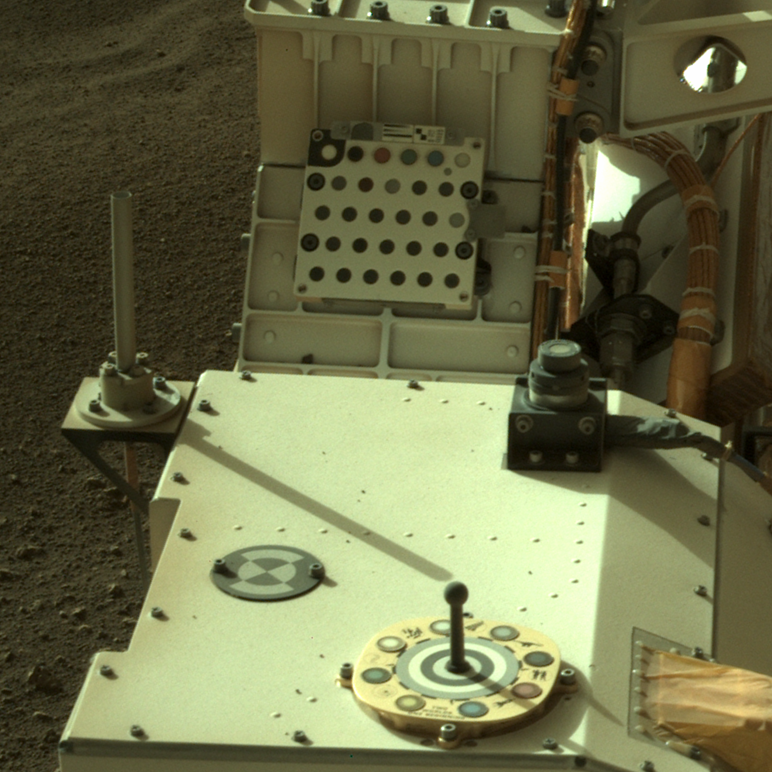
The monopole antenna of the base station is mounted on a bracket in the right rear part of the rover.

Ingenuity uses a 425 by 165 mm (16.7 by 6.5 in) solar panel, with an area of 70,125 mm^{2} (108.7 in^{2}) to recharge its batteries, which are six Sony Li-ion cells with 35–40 Wh (130–140 kJ) of energy capacity (nameplate capacity of 2 Ah). Flight duration is not constrained by available battery power, but by thermals – during flight, the drive motors heat up by 1 °C every second, and the thin Martian atmosphere makes for poor heat dissipation. The helicopter uses a Qualcomm Snapdragon 801 processor running a Linux operating system. Among other functions, it controls the visual navigation algorithm via a velocity estimate derived from terrain features tracked with the navigation camera. The Qualcomm processor is connected to two radiation-resistant flight-control microcontrollers (MCUs) to perform necessary control functions.

The telecommunication system consists of two identical radios with monopole antennae for data exchange between the helicopter and rover. The radio link uses the low-power Zigbee communication protocols, implemented via 914 MHz SiFlex 02 chipsets mounted in both vehicles. The communication system is designed to relay data at 250 kbit/s over distances of up to 1,000 m (3,300 ft). The omnidirectional antenna is part of the helicopter's solar panel assembly and weighs 4 grams (0.14 oz).

=== Cameras and photography ===
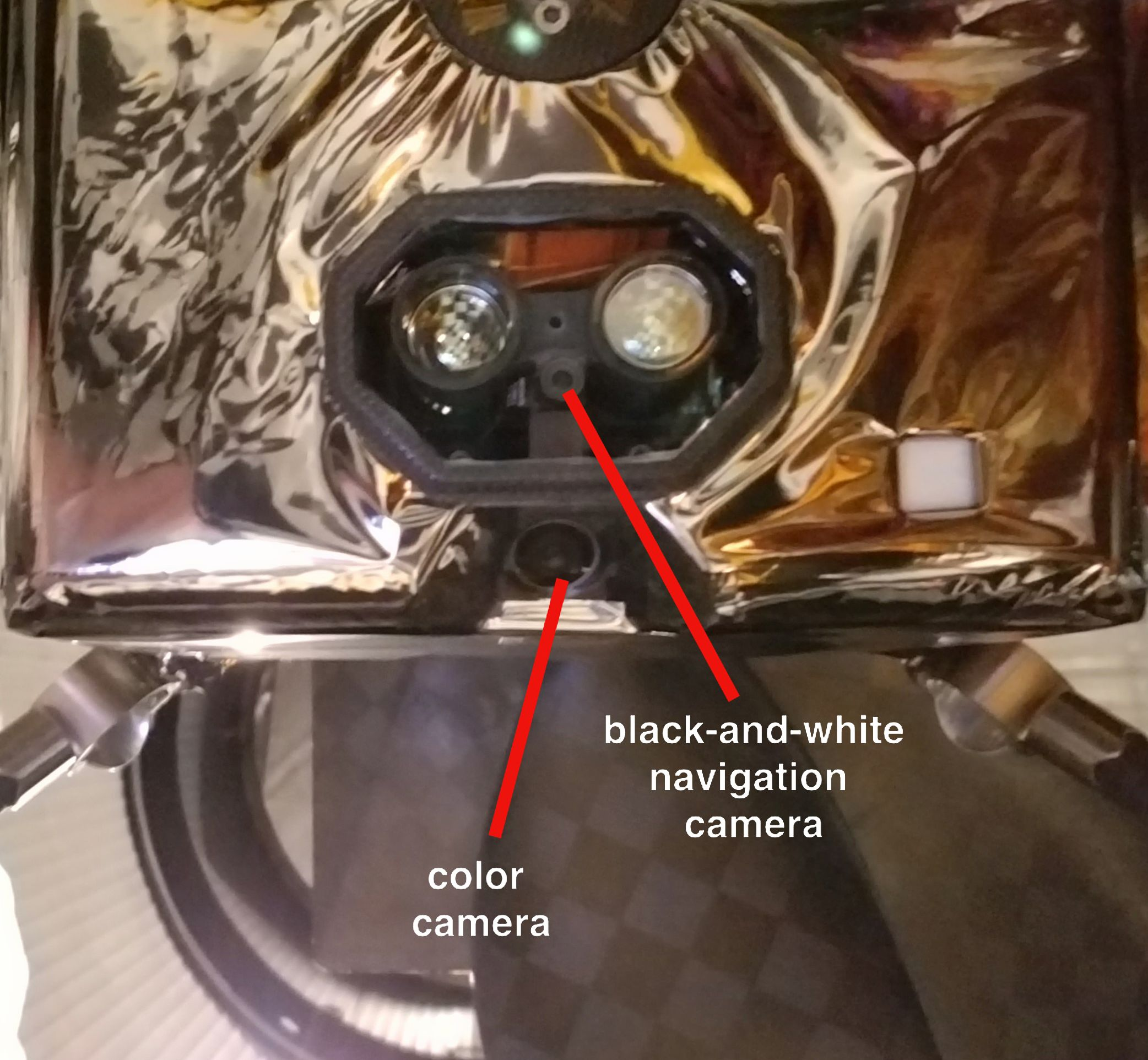
Ingenuity's two cameras, as seen from under the aircraft

Ingenuity is equipped with two commercial-off-the-shelf (COTS) cameras: a high-resolution Return to Earth (RTE) camera and a lower resolution navigation (NAV) camera. The RTE camera consists of the Sony IMX214, a rolling shutter, 4208 × 3120-pixel resolution color sensor with a built-in Bayer color filter array and fitted to an O-film optics module. The NAV camera consists of an Omnivision OV7251, a 640 × 480 black and white global shutter sensor, mounted to a Sunny optics module.

Unlike Perseverance, Ingenuity does not have a special stereo camera for taking twin photos for 3D pictures simultaneously. However, the helicopter can make such images by taking duplicate color photos of the same terrain while hovering in slightly offset positions, as in flight 11, or by taking an offset picture on the return leg of a roundtrip flight, as in flight 12.

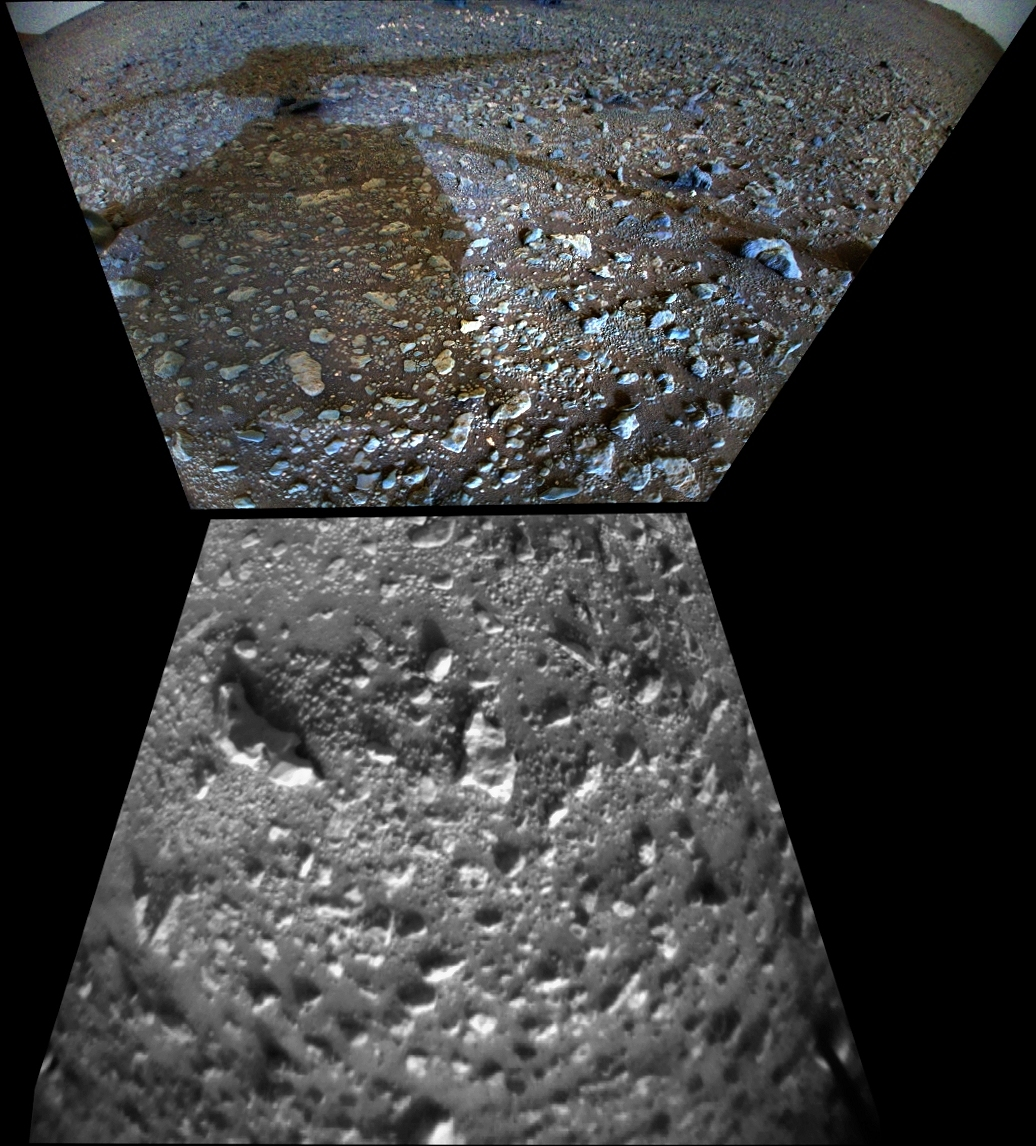
Combination of two images, one each from Ingenuity's Navigation Camera and color camera (RTE), taken while Ingenuity was on the ground

While the RTE color camera is not necessary for flights (as in flights 7 and 8), the NAV camera operates continuously throughout each flight, with the captured images used for visual odometry to determine the aircraft's position and motion during flight. Due to limitations on the transmission rate between the aircraft, the rover, and Earth, only a limited number of images can be saved from each flight. Images to save for transmission are defined by the flight plan prior to each flight, and the remaining images from the NAV camera are discarded after use.

As of 16 December 2021, 2,091 black-and-white images from the navigation camera and 104 color images from the terrain camera (RTE) have been published.

Count of stored images from both cameras per each flight
Flight No.	Date (UTC) and Mars 2020 mission sol	Photographs		Comments
Flight No.	Date (UTC) and Mars 2020 mission sol	b/w NAV	color RTE	Comments
	Before 19 April 2021 (sol 58)	6	6	Preflight camera tests
1	19 April 2021 (sol 58)	15	—	
2	22 April 2021 (sol 61)	17	3	The first color photo session
3	25 April 2021 (sol 64)	24	4	
4	30 April 2021 (sol 69)	62	5	
5	7 May 2021 (sol 76)	128	6	
6	23 May 2021 (sol 91)	106	8	
7	8 June 2021 (sol 107)	72	0	RTE was turned off
8	22 June 2021 (sol 121)	186	0	RTE was turned off
9	5 July 2021 (sol 133)	193	10	
10	24 July 2021 (sol 152)	190	10	Five pairs of color images of Raised Ridges taken to make anaglyphs.
11	5 August 2021 (sol 164)	194	10	
12	16 August 2021 (Sol 174)	197	10	Five pairs of color images of Séítah taken to make anaglyphs.
13	5 September 2021 (Sol 193)	191	10	
	16 September 2021 (Sol 204) to 23 October 2021 (Sol 240)	9	1	preflight 14 tests
14	24 October 2021 (Sol 241)	182	—	
15	6 November 2021 (Sol 254)	191	10	
	15 November 2021 (Sol 263)	—	1	ground color photo
16	21 November 2021 (Sol 268)	185	9	
	27 November 2021 (Sol 274)	—	1	ground color photo
17	5 December 2021 (Sol 282)	192	—	
18	15 December 2021 (Sol 292)	184	—	
	20 December 2021 (Sol 297) to 3 February 2022 (Sol 341)	10	1	preflight 19 tests and post-dust storm debris removal operations
19	8 February 2022 (Sol 346)	92	—	
20	25 February 2022 (Sol 362)	110	10	
	27 February 2022 (Sol 364)	—	1	preflight 21 tests
21	10 March 2022 (Sol 375)	191	—	

=== Flight software ===
Ingenuity's Hazard Avoidance Capability tested on Earth by post-processing flight 9 images

The helicopter uses autonomous control during its flights, which are telerobotically planned and scripted by operators at Jet Propulsion Laboratory (JPL). It communicates with the Perseverance rover directly before and after each landing.

The flight control and navigation software on Ingenuity can be updated remotely, which has been used to correct software bugs and add new capabilities between flights. Prior to flight 34, the software was updated to avoid hazards during landing and to correct a navigation error when traveling over uneven terrain. This update became necessary as the helicopter traveled away from the relatively flat terrain of the original landing site, and towards more varied and hazardous terrain.

=== Specifications ===
Flight characteristics of Ingenuity
Rotor speed	2400–2700 rpm
Blade tip speed	<0.7 Mach
Originally planned operational time	1 to 5 flights within 30 sols
Flight time	Up to 167 seconds per flight
Maximum range, flight	704 m (2,310 ft)
Maximum range, radio	1,000 m (3,300 ft)
Maximum altitude	24 m (79 ft)
Maximum possible speed	Horizontal: 10 m/s (33 ft/s); Vertical: 3 m/s (9.8 ft/s)
Battery capacity	35–40 Wh (130–140 kJ)

== Operational history ==
=== Primary mission ===
Perseverance dropped the debris shield protecting Ingenuity on 21 March 2021, and the helicopter deployed from the underside of the rover to the Martian surface on 3 April 2021. That day both cameras of the helicopter were tested taking their first black-and-white and color photographs of the floor of Jezero Crater in the shadow of the rover. After deployment, the rover drove about 100 m (330 ft) away from the drone to allow a safe flying zone.

Ingenuity's rotor blades were unlocked on 8 April 2021, (mission sol 48), and the helicopter performed a low-speed rotor spin test at 50 rpm.

A high-speed spin test was attempted on 9 April, but failed due to the expiration of a watchdog timer, a software measure to protect the helicopter from incorrect operation in unforeseen conditions. On 12 April, JPL said it identified a software fix to correct the problem. To save time, however, JPL decided to use a workaround procedure, which managers said had an 85% chance of succeeding and would be "the least disruptive" to the helicopter.

On 16 April 2021, Ingenuity passed the full-speed 2400 rpm rotor spin test while remaining on the surface. Three days later, 19 April, JPL flew the helicopter for the first time. The watchdog timer problem occurred again when the fourth flight was attempted. Rescheduled for 30 April, the fourth flight captured numerous color photos and explored the surface with its black-and-white navigation camera.

On 25 June, JPL said it had uploaded a software update the previous week to permanently fix the watchdog problem, and that a rotor spin test and the eighth flight confirmed that the update worked.

Each flight was planned for altitudes ranging 3–5 m (10–16 ft) above the ground, though Ingenuity soon exceeded that planned height. The first flight was a hover at an altitude of 3 m (10 ft), lasting about 40 seconds and including taking a picture of the rover. The first flight succeeded, and subsequent flights were increasingly ambitious as allotted time for operating the helicopter dwindled. JPL said the mission might even stop before the 30-day period ended, in the likely event that the helicopter crashed, an outcome which did not occur. In up to 90 seconds per flight, Ingenuity could travel as far as 50 m (160 ft) downrange and then back to the starting area, though that goal was also soon exceeded with the fourth flight.

The deployment sequence was as follows:

Surface deployment sequence

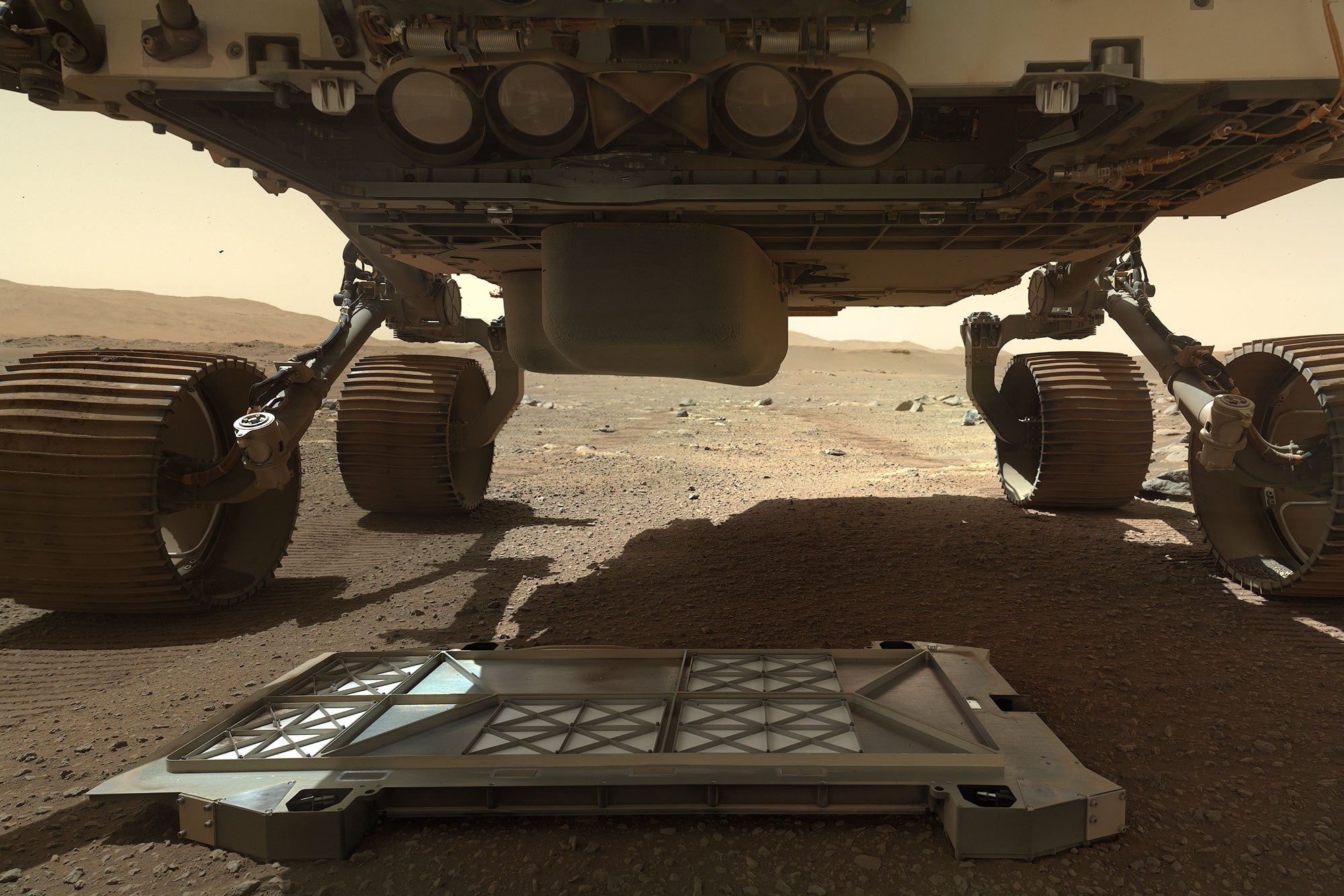
Step 1, Perseverance drops the pan that protected the RIMFAX equipment during the landing and drives away from it

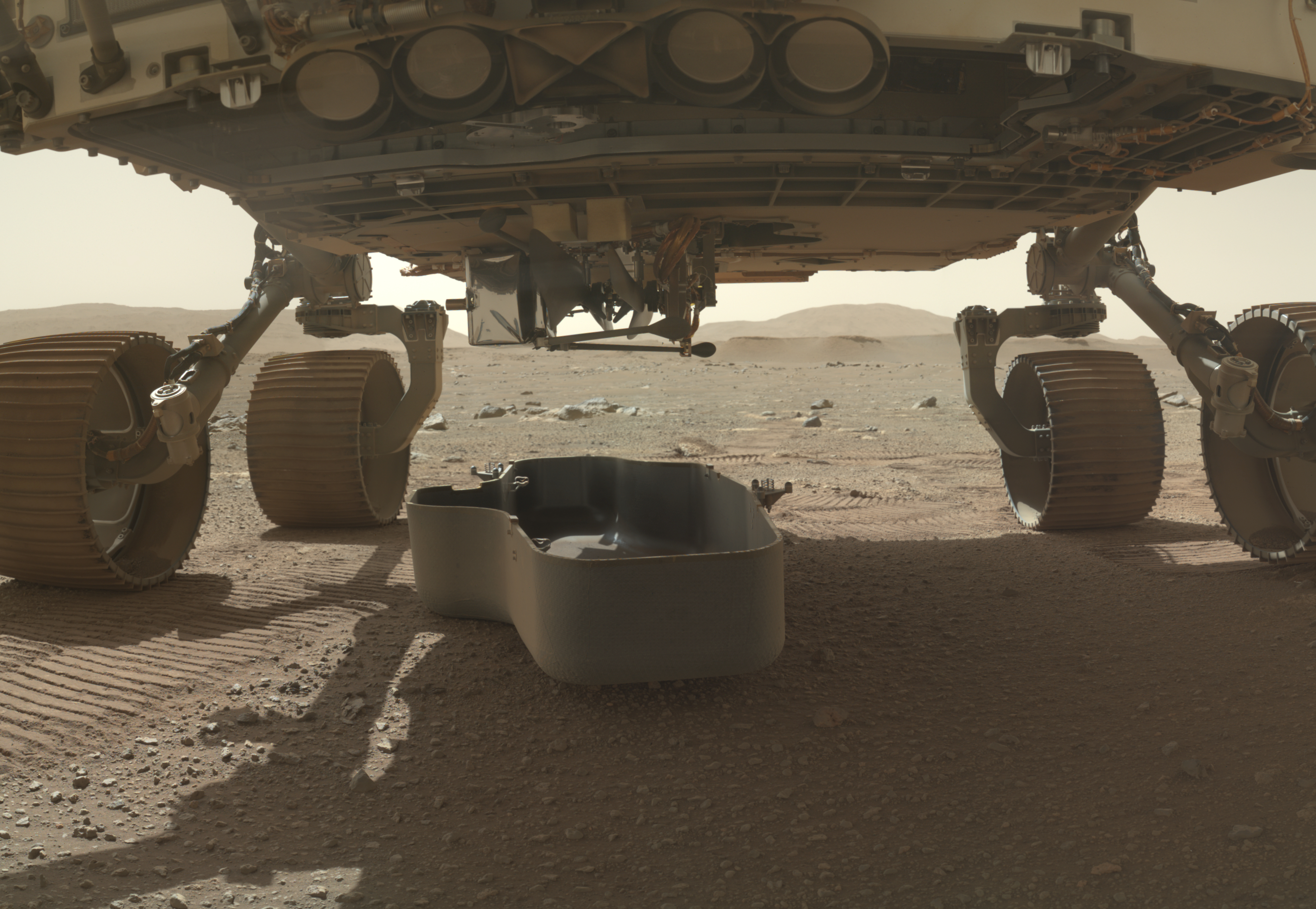
Step 2, the protective debris shield is dropped, exposing Ingenuity, which is stowed on its side. Perseverance then drives away from it

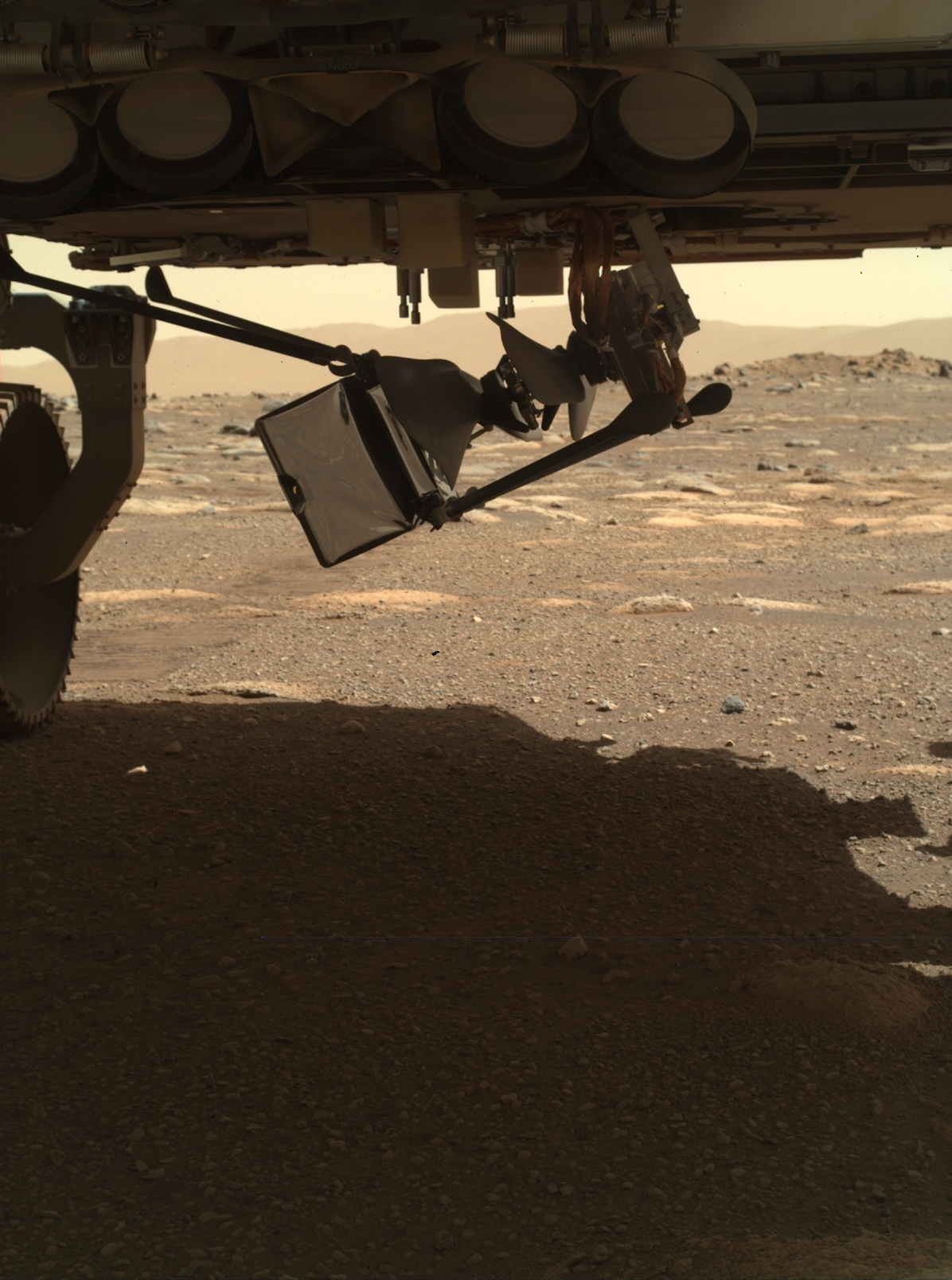
Step 3, Ingenuity swings down, with two of its four legs extended

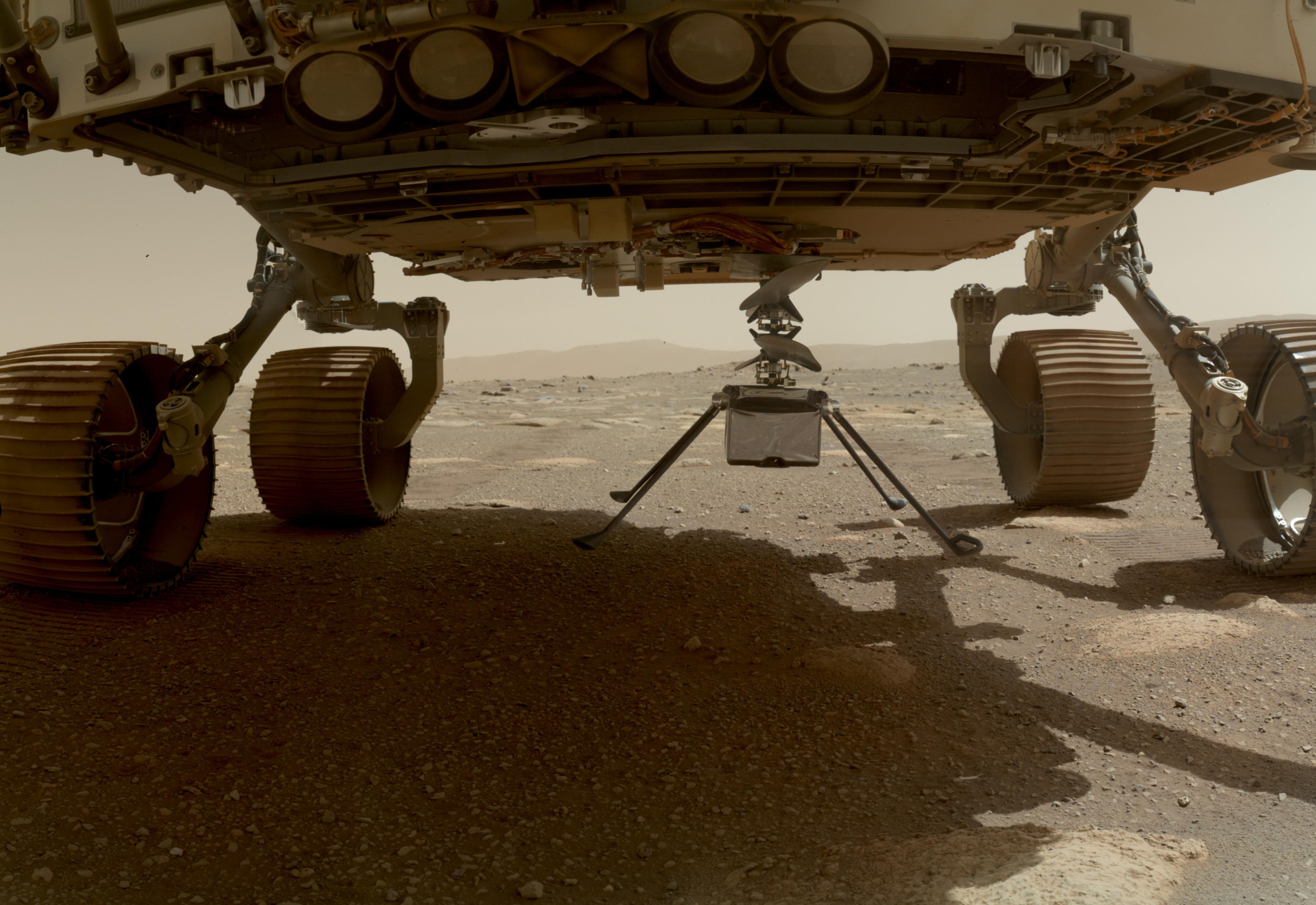
Step 4, all four legs are extended before Ingenuity is deployed on the surface and Perseverance drives away

After the successful first three flights, the objective was changed from technology demonstration to operational demonstration. Ingenuity flew through a transitional phase of two flights, 4 and 5, before beginning its operations demonstration phase. By November 2023, the principal mission priorities had become:

- Avoid significant interference with, or delay of, rover operations
- Maintain vehicle health and safety
- Perform scouting for tactical planning and science assessment
- Perform experiments to inform mission and vehicle design for future Mars rotorcraft, or collect data for discretionary science

=== Operations Demo Phase ===
Ingenuity on Mars, flight 54, 3 August 2023

Ingenuity, heard by Perseverance, flight 4

Just before the final demonstration flight on 30 April 2021, NASA approved the continued operation of Ingenuity in an "operational demonstration phase" to explore using a helicopter as supplementary reconnaissance for ground assets like Perseverance. Funding for Ingenuity was renewed monthly.

With flight 6, the mission goal shifted towards mapping and scouting the terrain. While Ingenuity would do more to help Perseverance, the rover would pay less attention to the helicopter and stop taking pictures of it in flight. JPL managers said the photo procedure took an "enormous" amount of time, slowing the project's main mission of looking for signs of ancient life.

On 7 May, Ingenuity flew to a new landing site.

After 12 flights by September 2021, the mission was extended indefinitely. After 21 flights by March 2022, NASA said it would continue flying Ingenuity every two to three weeks. The area of the helicopter's next goal was more rugged than the relatively flat terrain it flew over in its first year of operation. The ancient fan-shaped river delta has jagged cliffs, angled surfaces, and projecting boulders. Ingenuity helped the mission team decide which route Perseverance should take to the top of the delta and aided it in analyzing potential science targets. Software updates eliminated the helicopter's 15-meter (50 ft) altitude limit, allowed it to change speed in flight, and improved its understanding of terrain texture below it.

The helicopter's flying career lasted into a seasonal change on Mars. This lowered the atmospheric density, which required higher rotor speed for flight: probably 2700 rpm, according to the flight team's calculations. JPL said this might cause dangerous vibration, power consumption, and aerodynamic drag if the blade tips approach the speed of sound. So the flight team commanded Ingenuity to test the rotor at 2800 rpm while remaining on the ground.

In mid-September, the flight team began preparing for the Martian winter and solar conjunction, when Mars moves behind the Sun (as viewed from earth), blocking communications with Earth and forcing the rover and helicopter to halt operations. When the shutdown began in mid-October 2021 the helicopter remained stationary 175 meters (575 feet) from Perseverance and communicated its status weekly to the rover for health checks. JPL intended to continue flying Ingenuity since it survived solar conjunction. NASA leaders extended the mission, even though it would increase the project's expenses.

The launch time of each flight was influenced by the temperature of the batteries, which needed to warm up after the night. During Martian summer, lower air density imposed a higher load on the motors, so flights were shifted from noon (LMST 12:30) to morning (LMST 9:30) and limited to 130 seconds to not overheat the motors.

On 3 and 4 May 2022, the helicopter unexpectedly failed to communicate with the rover, following the 28th flight on 29 April. JPL determined that Ingenuity's rechargeable batteries suffered a power drop or insufficient battery state-of-charge while going into the night, most likely because of a seasonal increase in atmospheric dust reducing sunshine on its solar panel and due to lower temperatures as winter approached. When the battery pack's state of charge dropped below a lower limit, the helicopter's field-programmable gate array (FPGA) powered down, resetting the mission clock, which lost sync with the base station on the rover. Contact was re-established on 5 May. Controllers decided to turn off the helicopter's heaters at night to conserve power, accepting the risk of exposing components to nighttime's extreme cold. This daily state-of-charge deficit was stated to likely persist for the duration of Martian winter (at least until September/October).

On 6 June 2022, JPL reported Ingenuity's inclination sensor had stopped working. Its purpose was to determine the helicopter's orientation at the start of each flight. Mission controllers developed a workaround using the craft's inertial measurement unit (IMU) to provide equivalent data to the onboard navigation computer.

In January 2023, the helicopter began to have enough solar power to avoid overnight brownouts and FPGA resets due to the start of Martian spring. This meant the helicopter was able to fly more frequently and over longer distances.

In March 2023, the helicopter made frequent flights to deal with limited radio range in the rough terrain of the Jezero delta. In the narrow canyons of the river delta, the helicopter needed to stay ahead of the rover, rather than entering a "keep out" zone and passing it, which JPL considered potentially hazardous.

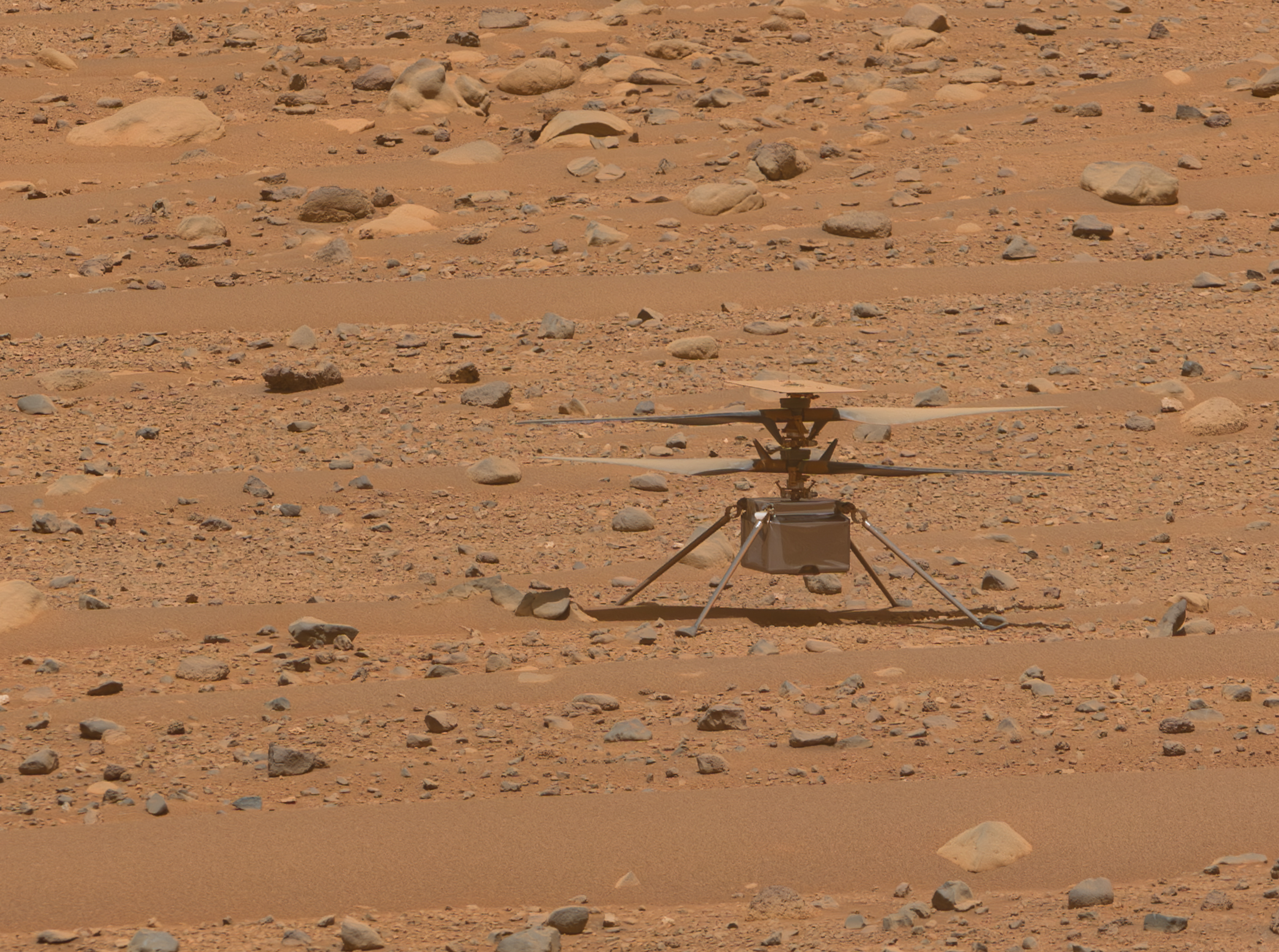
View of Ingenuity as seen by Perseverance's Mastcam-Z, taken on 18 April 2023

Three times, mission controllers lost contact with Ingenuity after a flight, when the helicopter was not in the line of sight with Perseverance, preventing radio communication with the rover, which relays flight data between the helicopter and Earth. After the 49th flight on 2 April 2023, JPL lost contact with Ingenuity for six days, until Perseverance drove to a spot where communication was re-established. JPL had no contact with the helicopter for 63 days after flight 52 on 26 April 2023. Mission controllers had intentionally flown Ingenuity out of radio range, expecting to regain communication in a few days. Perseverance controllers, however, changed their exploration plans and drove further out of range, and then had difficulty collecting rock samples, adding another delay before finally driving toward the helicopter and re-establishing contact on 28 June. Communication with Ingenuity was lost again at the end of flight 72 on 18 January 2024. Communication was re-established on 20 January but during the subsequent post-flight assessment, images of Ingenuity's shadow, taken by its navigation and horizon cameras after the flight, showed damage to its rotor blade tips. This ended the Operations Demo Phase and the mission.

=== Flight 72 accident ===
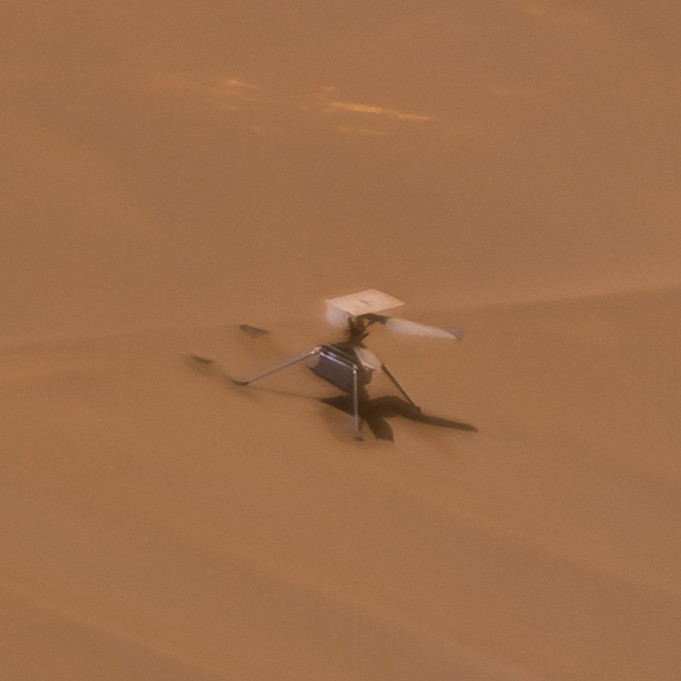
View of Ingenuity with missing and damaged blades

On 18 January 2024 during the landing of flight 72, a rotor blade broke off and other blade tips were damaged, resulting in Ingenuity's permanent grounding. The accident is believed to have resulted from an autonomous navigation error in a mostly featureless area of sand dunes, which offered few points of reference. JPL said such problems may be avoided in the future with an established GPS system on Mars.

In the days after its accident, Ingenuity remained responsive to signals from JPL, which commanded a low-speed rotation of the rotors to show their shadows at different angles. The helicopter photographed the shadows, which revealed that one of the blades was entirely missing. On 26 February 2024, NASA released images from Perseverance, which had driven to within 450 m (1,480 ft) of Ingenuity, showing the blade lying on the sand roughly 15 m (50 ft) from the body of the helicopter; another image shows Ingenuity sitting upright, without the blade.

Engineers from JPL and AeroVironment concluded that the inability of Ingenuity's navigation system to provide accurate data during the flight likely caused problems that ended the mission. The helicopter's vision navigation system was designed to track textured surface features using a downward-looking camera. This capability successfully carried out Ingenuity's first five flights and dozens more, but on flight 72 the helicopter was in a region of Jezero Crater filled with steep, relatively featureless sand ripples.

The navigation system was designed to provide velocity estimates that would enable the helicopter to land within a small range of vertical and horizontal velocities. Data from flight 72 showed that, around 20 seconds after takeoff, the navigation system could not find enough surface features to track. Photographs taken after the flight indicated the navigation errors created high horizontal velocities at touchdown. In the most likely scenario, the hard impact on the sand ripple's slope caused Ingenuity to pitch and roll. The sudden tilting resulted in loads on the fast-rotating rotor blades beyond their design limits, snapping all four of them off at their weakest point—about a third of the way from the tip. The damaged blades caused excessive vibration in the rotor system, ripping the remainder of one blade from its root and generating an excessive power demand that resulted in the temporary loss of communications. Shortly after Ingenuity was confirmed non-airworthy, JPL assembled an incident investigation team to determine the probable cause of the indent and provide recommendations for future Martian rotorcraft. The complete final flight report, including detailed technical findings and recommendations is publicly available through JPL's Open Repository.

=== End of mission ===
On 25 January 2024, NASA administrator Bill Nelson announced the end of the mission. Ingenuity's final location is at Airfield Chi (χ) within the area since nicknamed by the project team as the Valinor Hills – a reference to Valinor, the land of the immortals in author J.R.R. Tolkien's fantasy world of Middle-earth.

Following a few final transmissions and a farewell message by the rotorcraft on 16 April 2024, the JPL team uploaded new software commands that direct the helicopter to continue collecting data well after its communications with the rover have ceased. Ingenuity will serve as a stationary platform, testing the performance of its solar panel, batteries, and other electronic equipment. In addition, the helicopter will take a picture of the surface with its color camera and collect temperature data from sensors placed throughout the rotorcraft and store it on board, such that in case of future retrieval by either a rover, aircraft or astronauts, the results will provide a long-term perspective on Martian weather patterns and dust movement, aiding the design of future rotorcraft. Engineers expect Ingenuity to store up to 20 years of daily data, if the craft is unhampered by the local conditions. Perseverance will continue exploration of Jezero crater, out of Ingenuity's radio range.

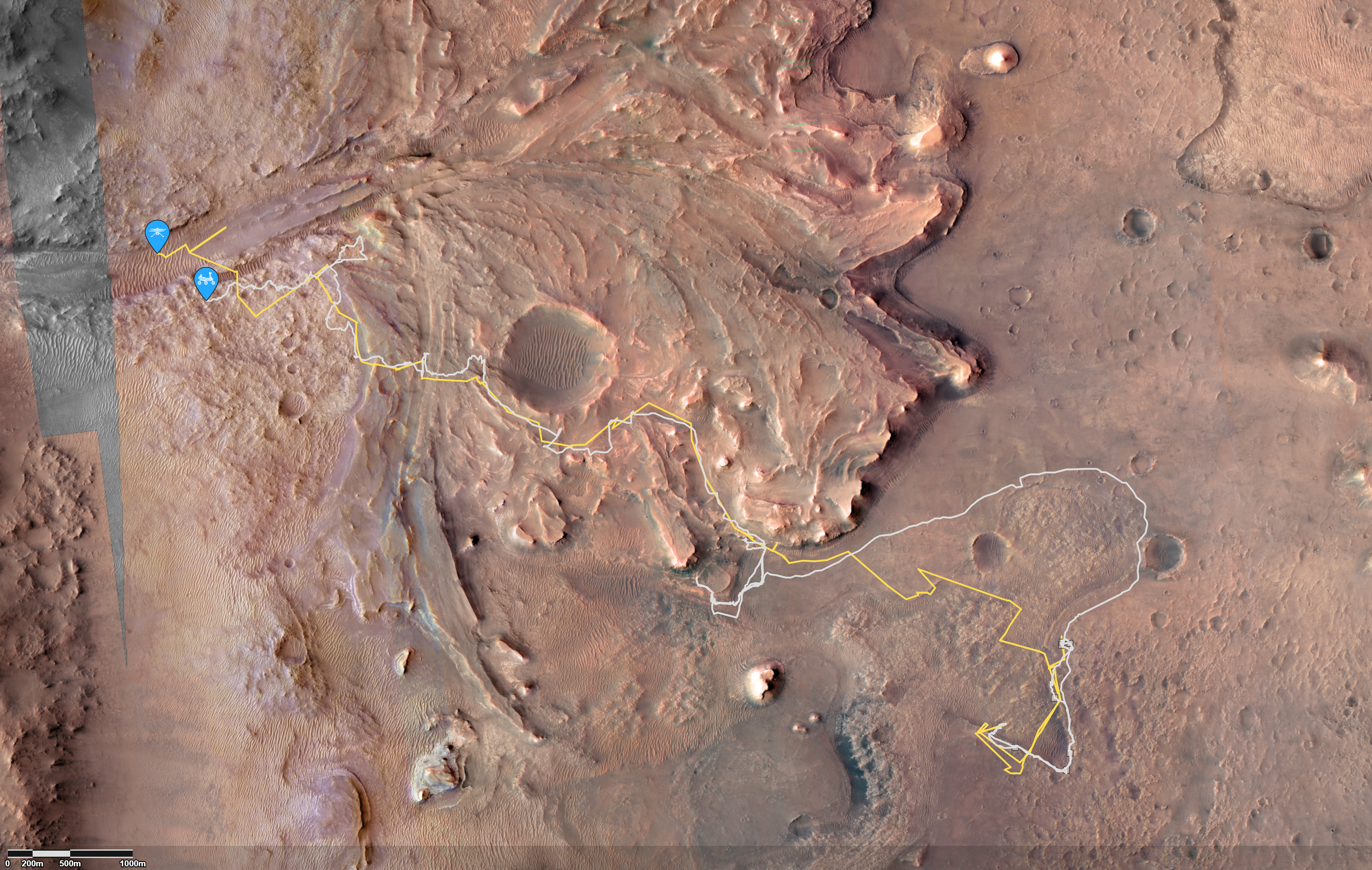
Ingenuity's total flight path (in yellow) at the end of mission. Also shown is the track of the Perseverance rover up to that point.

== Follow-on missions, future work and conceptions ==
There are currently no plans to send Curiosity/Perseverance-class scientific laboratories to Mars, and funding for Martian projects is frozen to the level necessary to complete the Mars sample-return campaign.

=== Sample Return Helicopter ===
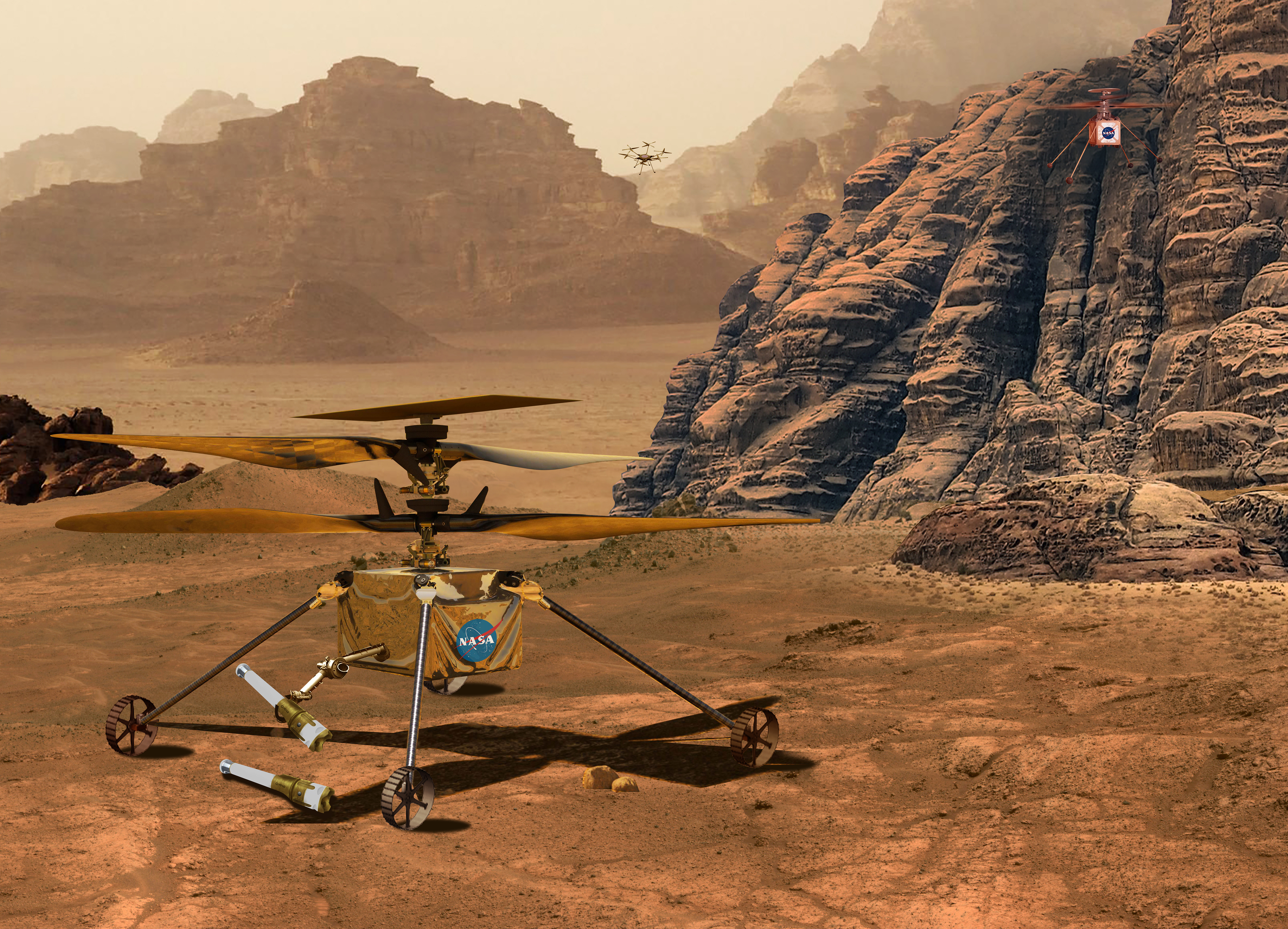
Sample Return Helicopter, based on Ingenuity

The idea of future Martian helicopters has been proposed. In March 2022, AeroVironment engineers, who previously created Ingenuity, presented the concept of a new helicopter with a payload of 280 grams (9.9 oz). A 90-gram (3.2 oz) small manipulator arm with a two-fingered gripper and a self-propelled landing gear make it possible to use vehicles of this type instead of a fetch rover to select sample tubes cases with samples collected by Perseverance. At a briefing on 15 September 2022, Laurie Glaze, director, NASA Science Mission Directorate confirmed her intention to use two of these helicopters.

The choice of Ingenuity as the prototype for the intended pair of assembler helicopters was based on the impressive safety margin built into it by AeroVironment designers. In principle, even the limit of 100 landings for the high-wear shock absorbers of the chassis is sufficient to transfer all 43 sleeves. Multiple small payloads can be carried by these types of helicopters, deployed and re-deployed to various locations, to perform a variety of distributed and networked operations.

Inertial navigation was one of the main challenges on Mars for Ingenuity. The helicopter needs to show the ability to accurately follow the track it has already "mapped" on previously collected NAV frame sets and land at the takeoff point. In a future sample return mission, each cartridge case would require a pair of flights ending at the point of departure. Landing accuracy was an assigned task of Ingenuity's 31st flight. The very thin atmosphere of Mars does not allow repeating the maneuvers and landing techniques of terrestrial helicopters.

=== Mars Science Helicopter ===
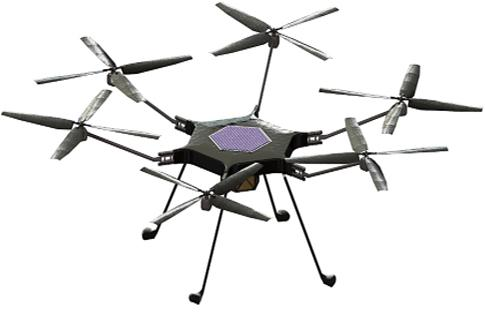
Mars Science Helicopter, Ingenuity's proposed successor

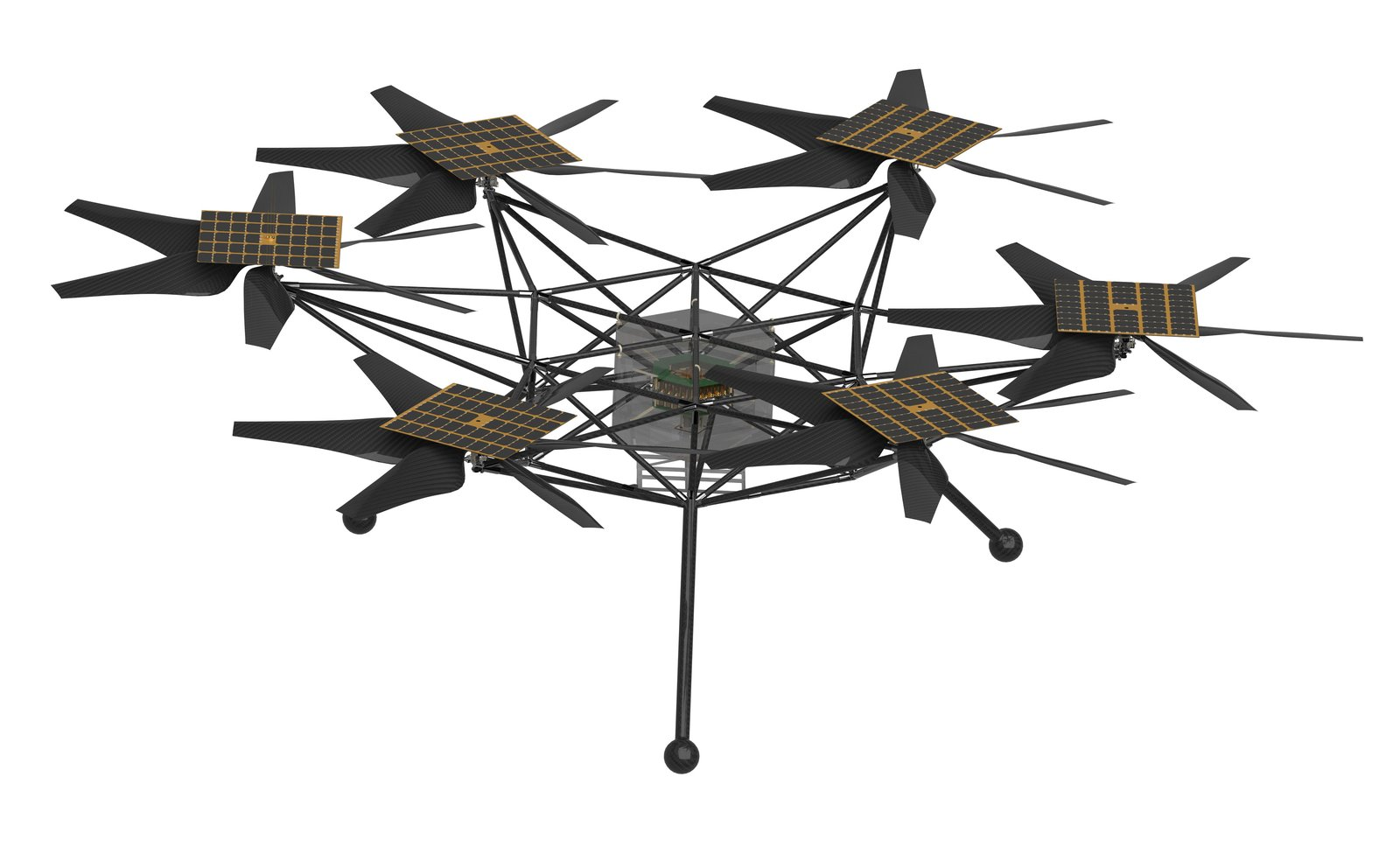
Mars Chopper concept, an updated design, as of 12/2024.

Data collected by Ingenuity is intended to support the development of future helicopters capable of carrying larger payloads. The Mars Science Helicopter task is the next evolutionary step for Martian rotorcraft at JPL. The key focus is to develop the technology needed to deploy science payloads, between 0.5 and 2.0 kg (1 and 4 lb), on rotorcraft platforms at the surface of Mars. MSH will inherit many of the technologies created by the Mars Helicopter Technology Demonstrator (MHTD) baselined for Mars 2020, and extend capabilities in order to enable a new class of mesoscale planetary access across Mars.

Designing and proving how science payloads can be deployed, recovered, integrated, and operated on a dynamically and computationally representative rotorcraft will be critical in expanding a new frontier for Martian scientific exploration.

The focus will include:

- Rotorcraft configurations capable of carrying and deploying science payloads
- Forecasting technological advancements in avionics, batteries, power systems, and navigation algorithms.
- Earthbound demonstration testbed for evaluating avionics and payload integrations along with MHTD inherited FSW, C&DH, and eventual autonomous science mission execution.

=== MAGGIE ===
Mars Aerial and Ground Global Intelligent Explorer (MAGGIE) is a compact fixed wing aircraft proposed during 2024 NIAC selections.

== Tributes to the Wright brothers ==
NASA and JPL officials described the first Mars Ingenuity helicopter flight as their "Wright Brothers moment", by analogy to the first successful powered airplane flight on Earth. A small piece of the wing cloth from the Wright brothers' 1903 Wright Flyer is attached to a cable underneath Ingenuity's solar panel. In 1969, Apollo 11's Neil Armstrong carried a similar Wright Flyer artifact to the Moon in the Lunar Module Eagle.

NASA named Ingenuity's first take-off and landing airstrip Wright Brothers Field, which the UN agency ICAO gave an airport code of JZRO for Jezero Crater, and the drone itself a type designator of IGY, call-sign INGENUITY.

== Gallery ==
=== Maps of flights ===
The flight zone of the technical demonstration and transitional stage

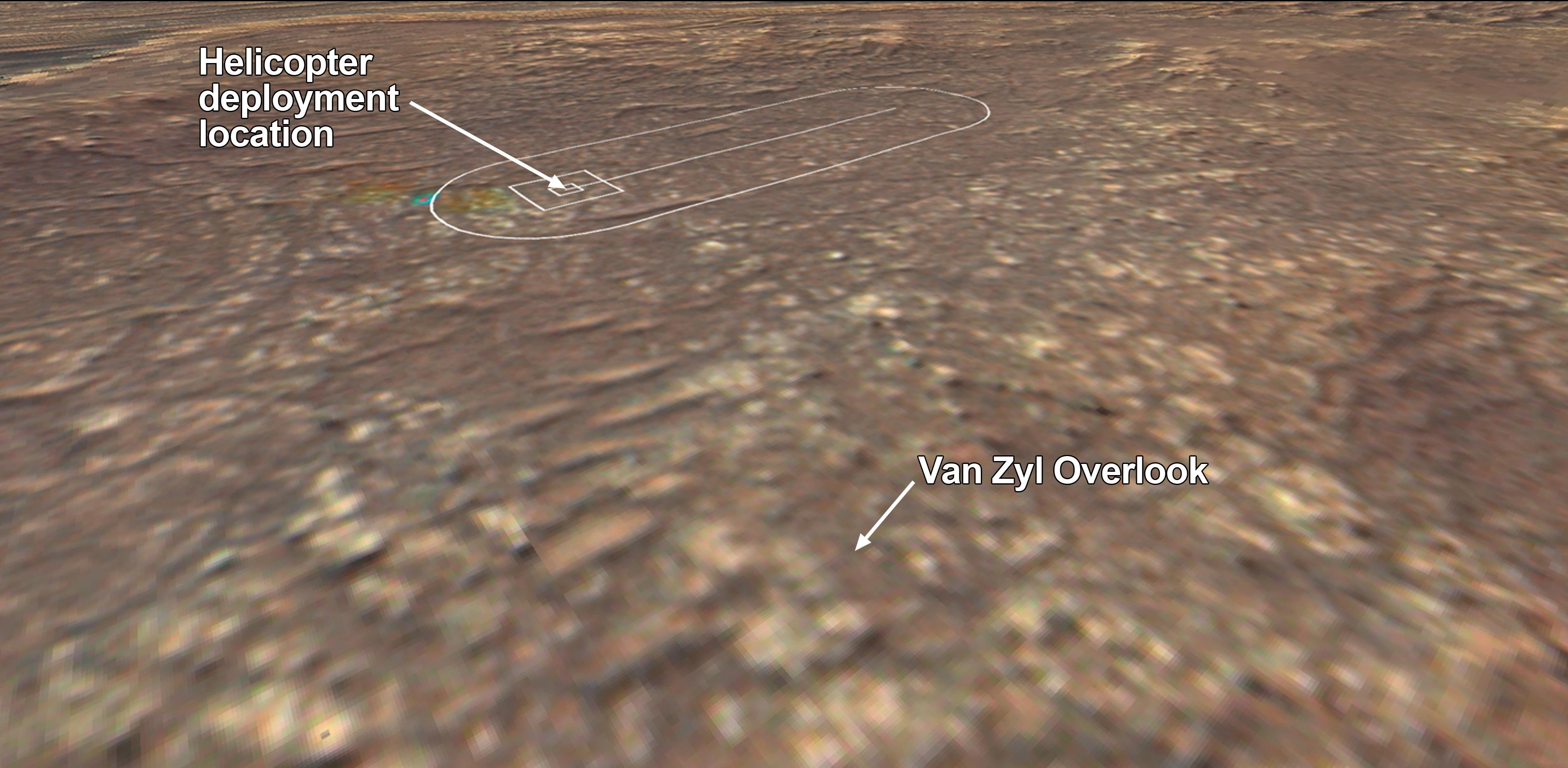
Wright Brothers Field and the overlook location

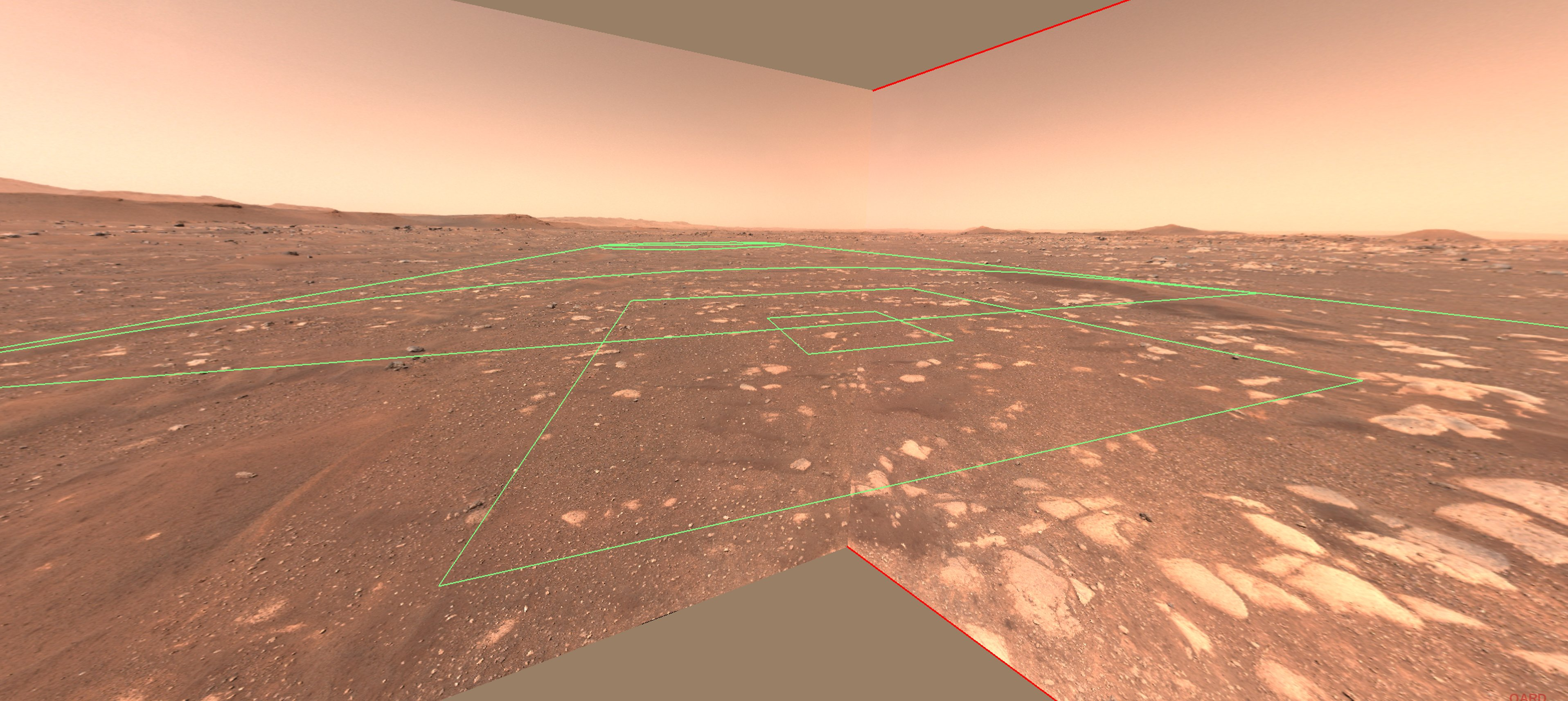
View of the field from the rover

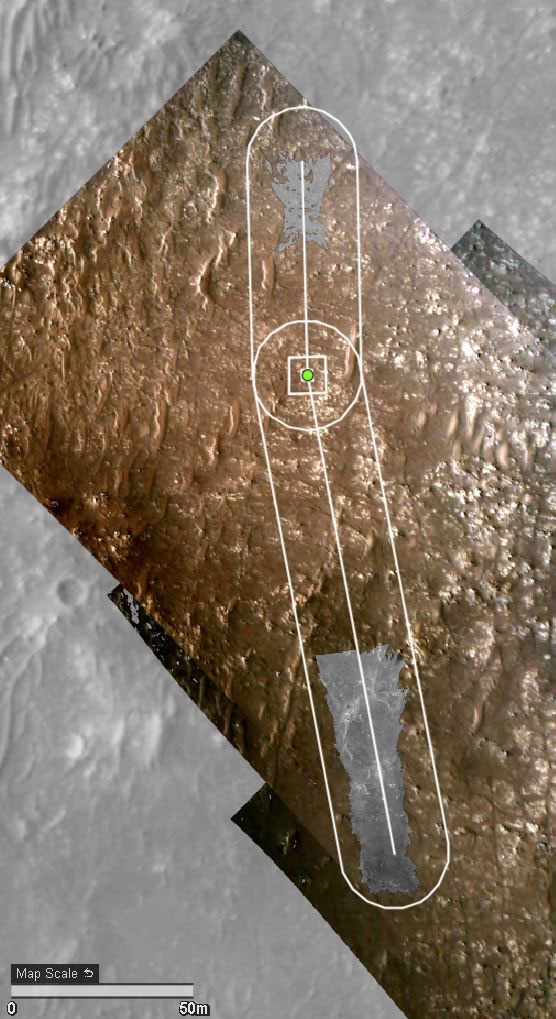
Airfield B (Note: HiRISE's view of Ingenuity's fourth flight path paving the way for it to move to Airfield B on flight 5)

Flight paths of the operational demonstration stage and HiRise images of Ingenuity

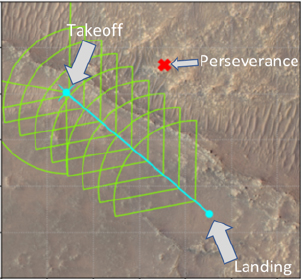
Flight profile for Ingenuity's Flight 15

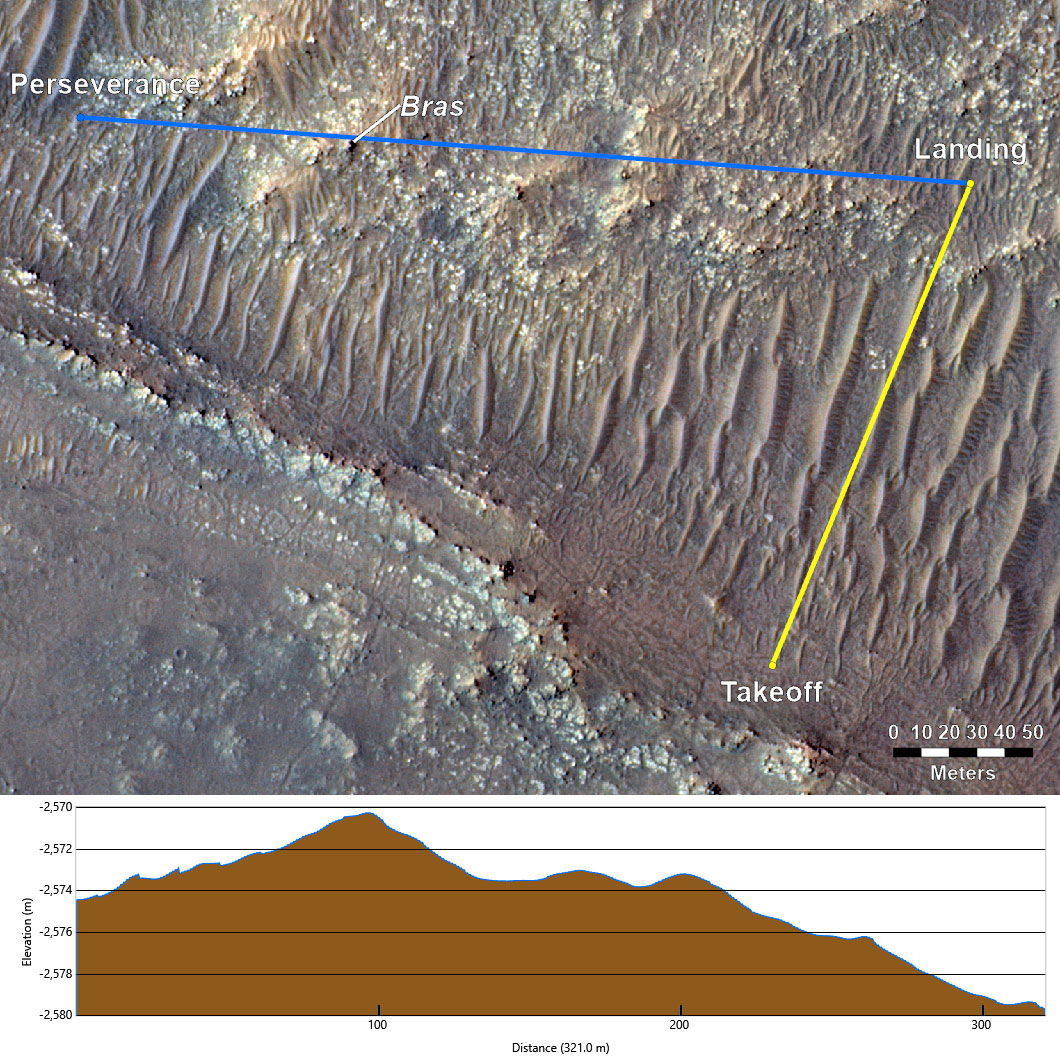
Topography between Mars helicopter and rover for Flight 17

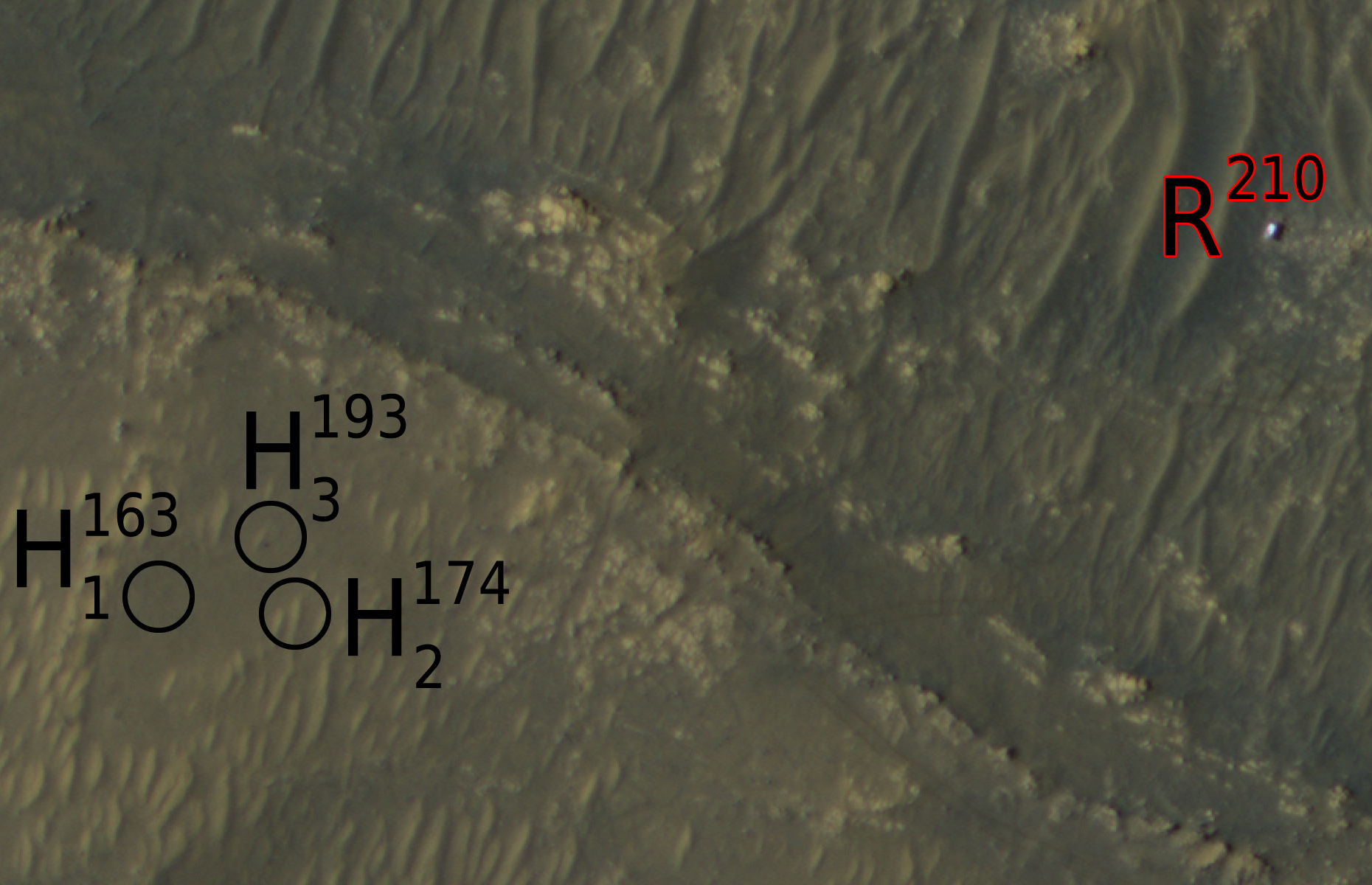
Positioning before the 2021 solar conjunction
R^{210} is the rover position on sol 210;
H^{163}_{1}, H^{174}_{2} and H^{193}_{3} means 1st, 2nd and 3rd landing sites of Ingenuity on the Field H on sols 163, 174 and 193 respectively

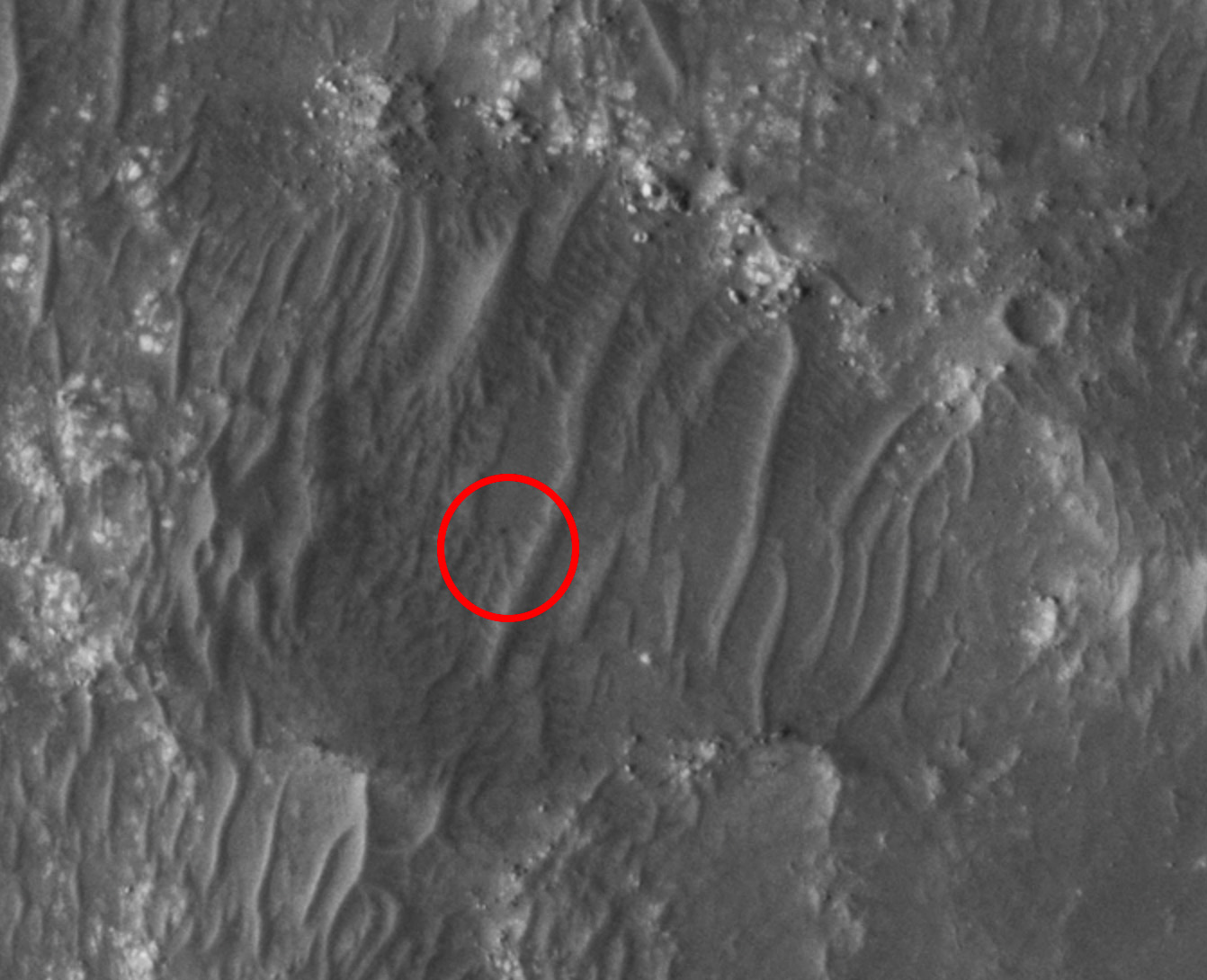
Ingenuity captured by HiRise camera on Mars Reconnaissance Orbiter at Airfield M on 26 February 2022

== See also ==
- ARES – 2008 robotic Mars aircraft proposal
- Coaxial rotors – Helicopter with two sets of rotor blades placed on top of each other
- Dragonfly – Robotic rotorcraft mission to Saturn's moon Titan, planned launch in 2028
- Exploration of Mars
- List of artificial objects on Mars
- Mars Aerial and Ground Global Intelligent Explorer – Solar aircraft concept to fly in Mars atmosphere
- Mars Piloted Orbital Station - manned Mars orbital command module concept to control robots on and above the surface
- Sky-Sailor – 2004 proposal of a robotic Mars aircraft
- Solar-powered aircraft
- Vega – The USSR space program that included the first atmospheric balloon flight on Venus, in 1985
