= Håvard Fjær Grip =

Norwegian cybernetics engineer

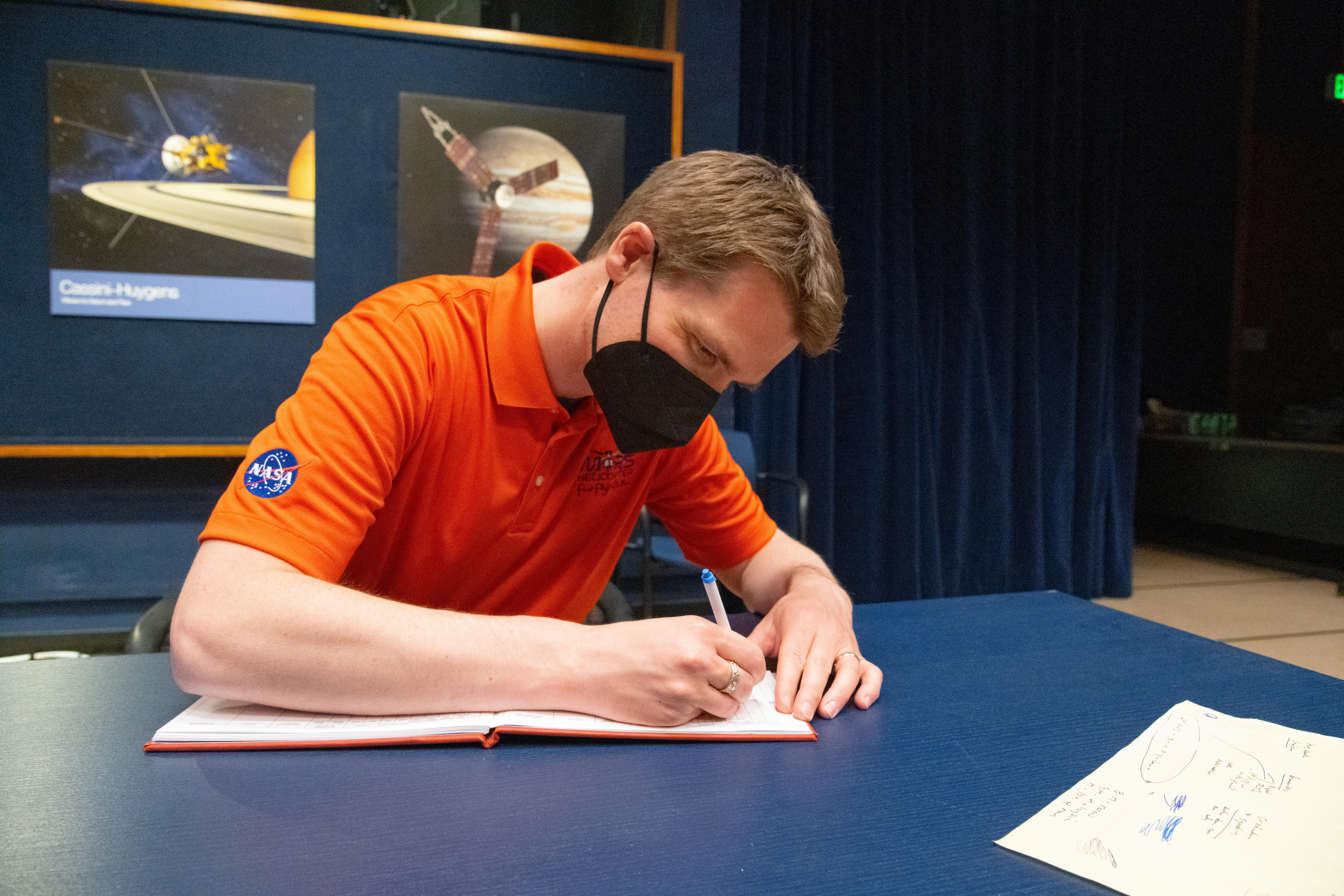
- Grip, entering Ingenuity flight details in the pilot’s logbook
- Education: Norwegian University of Science and Technology
- Known for: Pilot of first extraterrestrial helicopter flight
- Scientific career
- Fields: Cybernetics, Robotics
- Workplaces: Jet Propulsion Laboratory, California Institute of Technology, SINTEF, Daimler Group Research & Advanced Engineering, Washington State University
- Thesis: Topics in State and Parameter Estimation for Nonlinear and Uncertain Systems (2010)

Håvard Fjær Grip is a Norwegian cybernetics engineer and robotics technologist. He was the chief pilot of NASA's Jet Propulsion Laboratory's Mars helicopter, Ingenuity, and led the development of its aerodynamics and flight control system. Grip successfully flew Ingenuity's first flight on Mars on April 19, 2021, which made history as the first extraterrestrial helicopter flight. As of October 2023, he is chief engineer of the Mars Sample Recovery Helicopters, part of the NASA-ESA Mars Sample Return campaign.

== Career ==
From 2001 to 2006, Grip studied for a five-year engineering cybernetics master's degree, and from 2006 to 2010 a PhD at the Norwegian University of Science and Technology. During his studies he was recognized for outstanding academic performance in engineering studies, as well as having the best master's thesis in 2006 in Norway within the field of control and automation.

Grip's master's thesis was titled Nonlinear Vehicle Velocity Observer with Road-Tire Friction Adaptation. The dissertation focused on real-time estimation of dynamic variables for use in safety systems in cars, such as anti-lock brakes and electronic stability program. Automotive corporation Daimler AG showed interest in Grip's work, and hired him for a contract project at the Daimler Group Research & Advanced Engineering while employed as a scientific researcher at SINTEF ICT from 2007–2008, where he continued researching anti-collision systems for cars.

In 2010, Grip started working as an adjunct assistant professor at the School of Electrical Engineering and Computer Science at Washington State University, where he conducted an independent research project with a grant from the Research Council of Norway.

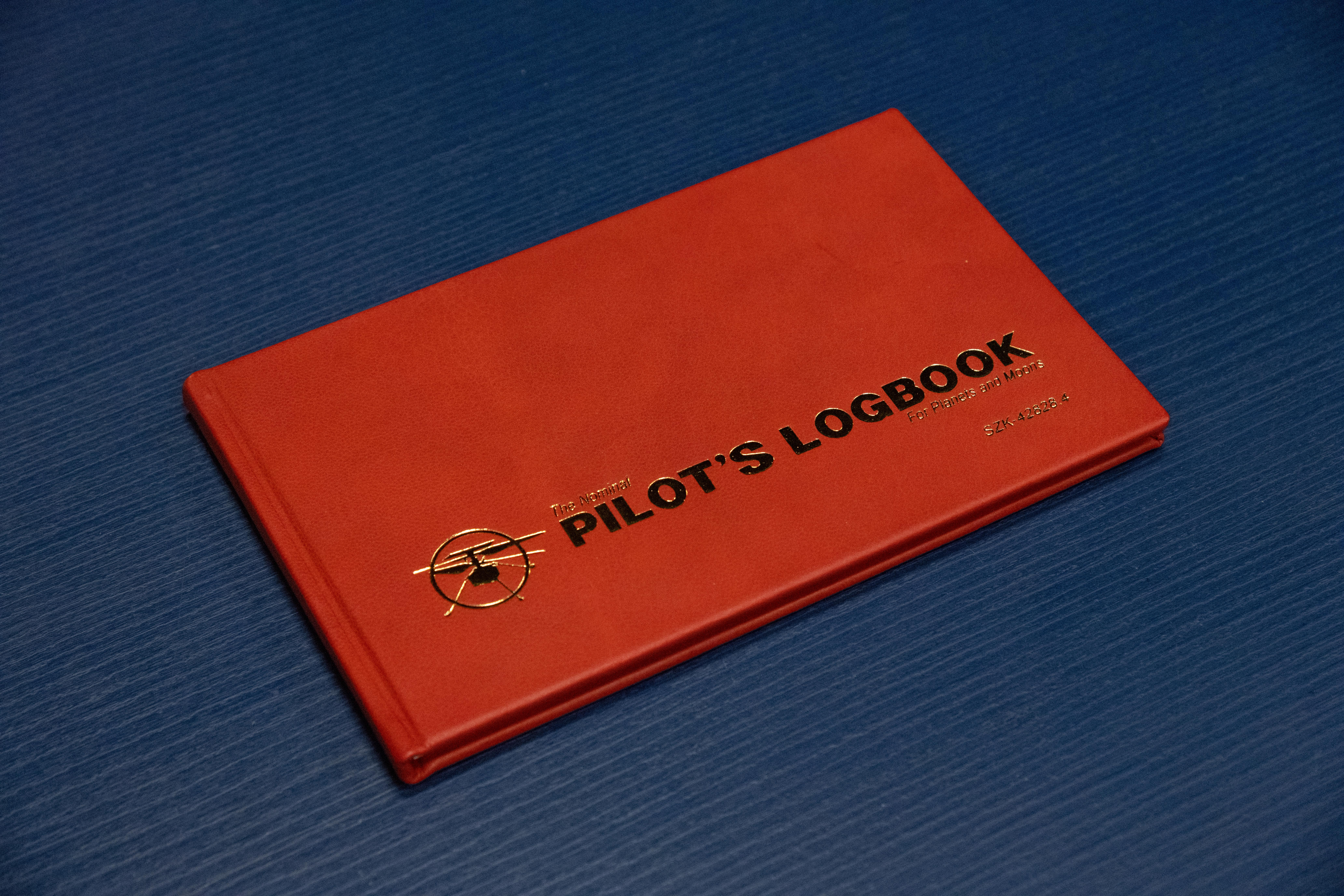
The pilot's logbook used by Grip to record data of Ingenuity's first flight on April 19, 2021. The book was given to the project by the International Civil Aviation Organization.

Since 2013, Grip has worked as a robotics technologist in the Guidance and Control Analysis Group at NASA's Jet Propulsion Laboratory at the California Institute of Technology. He led the Mars Helicopter Guidance, Navigation, and Control team, where he designed algorithms and software that helped control and guide the martian helicopter Ingenuity. Grip's role as chief pilot included planning the flight, constructing command sequences, and analyzing the flight data for the helicopter. Other team members that took part in the helicopter project included program executive Dave Lavery, chief engineer Bob Balaram, and project manager MiMi Aung.

The Martian helicopter was launched from Earth along with the rover Perseverance as part of NASA's Mars 2020 mission, a part of NASA's Mars Exploration Program. The rover's mission is to identify martian environments that is capable of supporting life. One of its instruments includes the Radar Imager for Mars' Subsurface Experiment, which is a georadar developed by the Norwegian Defence Research Establishment, led by principal investigator Svein-Erik Hamran, and a team that includes scientists from Norway, Canada and the United States.

On April 19, 2021, at 11:30 UTC, Grip flew Ingenuity for 39.1 seconds, raising the helicopter vertically about 10 feet (3.0 m), rotating in place 96 degrees in a planned maneuver, and landing it successfully.

Grip's research interests include nonlinear control and observer design, navigation and vehicle state estimation, decentralized control of heterogeneous systems, and structurally based design techniques for stability and robustness of nonlinear systems.

== Selected publications ==
- H. F. Grip, A. Saberi, and T. A. Johansen, "Observers for interconnected nonlinear and linear systems," Automatica, vol. 48, no. 7, pp. 1339–1346, 2012.
- H. F. Grip, T. Yang, A. Saberi, and A. A. Stoorvogel, "Output synchronization for heterogeneous networks of non-introspective agents," Automatica, vol. 48, no. 10, pp. 2444–2453, 2012.
- H. F. Grip, L. Imsland, T. A. Johansen, J. C. Kalkkuhl, and A. Suissa, "Vehicle sideslip estimation: Design, implementation, and experimental validation," IEEE Control Systems Magazine, vol. 29, no. 5, pp. 36–52, 2009.
