= National Air and Space Museum Trophy =

Annual award

The National Air and Space Museum Trophy was established in 1985. The trophy presented to the winners is a miniature version of "The Web of Space," a sculpture by artist John Safer. The National Air and Space Museum presents this trophy annually to recognize both past and present achievements involving the management or execution of a scientific or technological project, a distinguished career of service in air and space technology, or a significant contribution in chronicling the history of air and space technology.

The trophy was created for the National Air and Space Museum by John Safer of Washington, D.C., a well-known sculptor and banker. John Safer retired as chief executive officer of D.C. National Bank. The trophy became known as the Michael Collins Trophy in 2020.

== Recipients for Lifetime Achievements ==
- 2026 Farouk El-Baz
- 2025 Margaret Hamilton
- 2024 Peggy Whitson
- 2023 Bill Anders
- 2022 Wally Funk
- 2021 Gene Kranz
- 2020 Charles Elachi
- 2019 Charlie Bolden
- 2018 John R. Dailey
- 2017 Peter Theisinger
- 2016 James A. Lovell
- 2015 Stamatios Krimigis
- 2014 Norm Augustine
- 2013 Joe Sutter
- 2012 Burt Rutan
- 2011 George Mueller
- 2010 Christopher C. Kraft, Jr.
- 2009 John R. Casani and C. Gordon Fullerton
- 2008 Col. Joseph Kittinger
- 2007 Robert A. "Bob" Hoover
- 2006 James A. Van Allen
- 2005 Frank N. Piasecki
- 2004 Neil Armstrong
- 2003 (No Award) - In observance of the Centennial of Flight in 2003, the NASM did not award Trophy this year.
- 2002 Stanley Hiller Jr.
- 2001 Sen. John Glenn
- 2000 A. Scott Crossfield
- 1999 Dr. Simon Ramo
- 1998 Richard T. Whitcomb
- 1997 Anthony "Tony" LeVier
- 1996 Gen. Bernard A. Schriever, USAF (Ret.)
- 1995 Najeeb E. Halaby
- 1994 Dr. Michael H. Carr
- 1993 Olive Ann Beech
- 1992 Francis M. Rogallo
- 1991 Arthur E. Raymond
- 1990 Kelly Johnson and the SR-71 Design Team
- 1989 Edwin Land
- 1988 Harold Masursky
- 1987 John Steiner
- 1986 Sir Frank Whittle and Dr. Hans von Ohain
- 1985 Robert R. Gilruth

== Recipients for Current Achievement ==
- 2026 The Boeing Starliner Flight Test Crew
- 2025 OSIRIS-REx Team
- 2024 Double Asteroid Redirect Test (DART) Mission Team
- 2023 James Webb Space Telescope Team
- 2022 MiMi Aung & the Ingenuity Mars Helicopter Team
- 2021 SpaceX and Crew Dragon Team
- 2020 Hubble Space Telescope Team
- 2019 LIGO Scientific Collaboration
- 2018 Shaesta Waiz of Dreams Soar Inc.
- 2017 Kenn Borek Air's South Pole Rescue Team
- 2016 NASA's New Horizons Mission Team
- 2015 Kepler Mission Team
- 2014 The Dawn Flight Team
- 2013 Mars Science Laboratory Entry, Descent and Landing team, led by Adam Steltzner
- 2012 The Cassini-Huygens Flight Team
- 2011 Michael Suffredini and the International Space Station Program Office
- 2010 Flight crew of US Airways Flight 1549: Chesley B. Sullenberger III, Jeffrey B. Skiles, Sheila Dail, Donna Dent and Doreen Welsh
- 2009 (no award)**
- 2008 Stardust Comet Sample Return Mission Team
- 2007 NASA STS-121 shuttle mission team
- 2006 Mars Exploration Rover Team
- 2005 Burt Rutan, Paul Allen, and the SpaceShipOne Team
- 2004 USAF/Lockheed Martin Milstar Team
- 2003 (no award)*
- 2002 Predator Development Team
- 2001 NEAR Mission Team
- 2000 The Chandra X-Ray Observatory Team
- 1999 The Breitling Orbiter 3 Team
- 1998 The Mars Pathfinder Team
- 1997 Dr. Shannon W. Lucid
- 1996 The Boeing 777 Civilian Airliner Development Team
- 1995 The X-31 International Test Team
- 1994 Patty Wagstaff
- 1993 Dr. Compton J. Tucker
- 1992 The Magellan Project Team
- 1991 John C. Mather and the Cosmic Background Explorer Team
- 1990 The Pegasus Launch Vehicle Team
- 1989 The Voyager Spacecraft Team
- 1988 Paul MacCready
- 1987 Dick Rutan and Jeana Yeager
- 1986 John W. Young
- 1985 Astronauts Kathryn D. Sullivan, Ph.D. and Capt. Bruce McCandless, USN

* In observance of the many centennial of flight celebrations in 2003, the museum did not award Trophies for that year. ** In 2009, there was no award for Current Achievement and two Lifetime Achievement Trophies were awarded.
