= Timothy Canham =

American software engineer

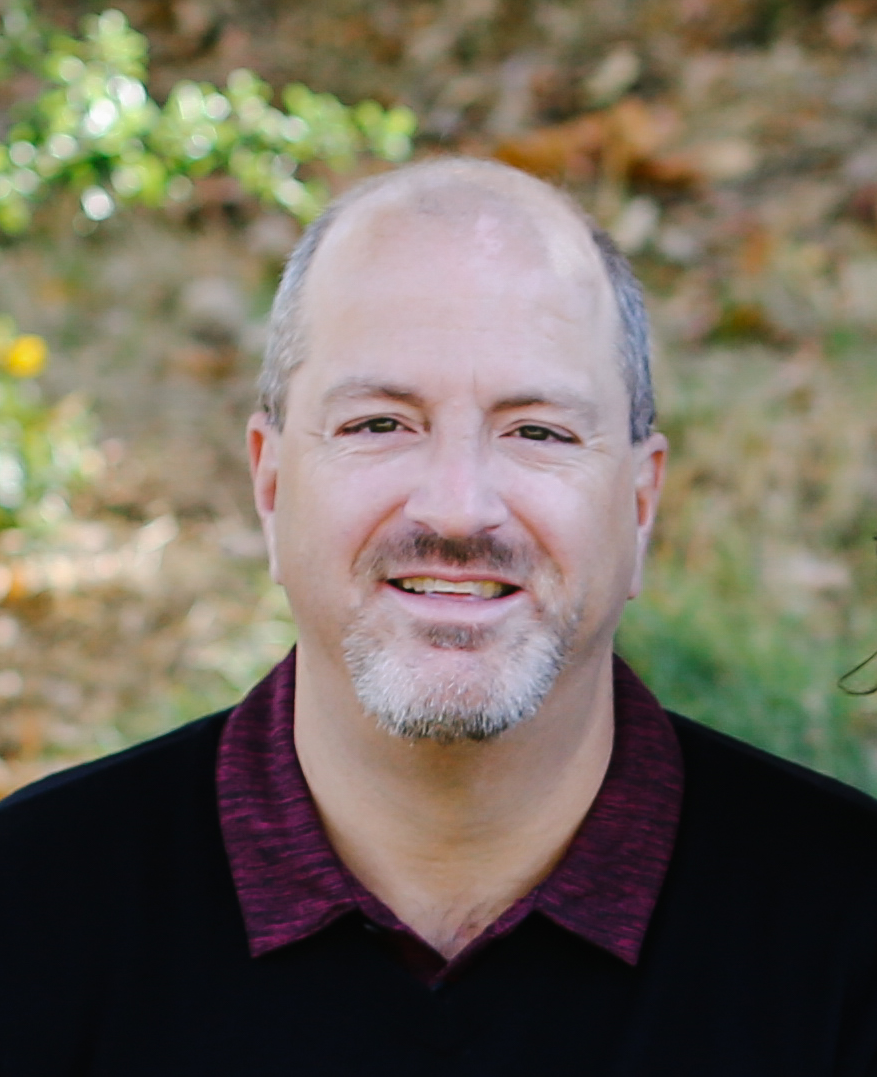
- Education: Marcus Whitman High School, Clarkson University (bachelor's degree, electrical and computer engineering)
- Known for: Software lead and operations lead for Ingenuity helicopter, which made the first extraterrestrial powered, controlled flight on April 19, 2021
- Awards: John L. “Jack” Swigert, Jr. Award for Space Exploration; 2022 Collier Trophy
- Scientific career
- Fields: Computer engineering, space science
- Institutions: NASA Jet Propulsion Laboratory

Timothy Canham is an American software engineer. He works at the Jet Propulsion Laboratory (JPL), where he is the operations lead and former software lead for the Mars helicopter Ingenuity. He resides in Santa Clarita, California.

== Education ==
Canham attended Marcus Whitman High School in Rushville, New York and Clarkson University, where he graduated in 1991 with a bachelor's degree in electrical and computer engineering.

== Career ==
Upon graduating from Clarkson University, Canham applied for a job at the Jet Propulsion Laboratory, and has worked there ever since with the exception of one year off in the 1990s. Prior to his work on Ingenuity, Canham developed software that resulted in the successful landing of Curiosity. He is an architect of the Fprime flight software framework, used in many JPL projects including Ingenuity.

Canham started working on the Ingenuity project in the summer of 2015, building a prototype of the helicopter to "test the basics" with a team of up to 20 people. The helicopter was selected to be taken on the Perseverance rover to Mars in 2017. In a February 2021 interview with IEEE, Canham revealed that the helicopter would be using a Linux operating system with open-source code and a Snapdragon 801 processor board and 500-hertz guidance loops. The Perseverance rover, which carried Ingenuity, landed on Mars on February 18, 2021 as part of the Mars 2020 mission; on April 19 of that year, Ingenuity completed the first ever powered, controlled extraterrestrial flight of an aircraft, which lasted 39.1 seconds. In addition to developing and operating spacecraft, Canham has participated in outreach activities at universities to assist students.

The Ingenuity team, which includes Canham, earned the 2021 John L. “Jack” Swigert, Jr. Award for Space Exploration from the Space Foundation. In 2022, the team was awarded the Collier Trophy by the National Aeronautic Association "for the first powered, controlled flight of an aircraft on another planet, thereby opening the skies of Mars and other worlds for future scientific discovery and exploration."

== Scientific publications ==
- Dan Dvorak, Greg Bollella, Timothy Canham, et al. Project Golden Gate: towards real-time Java in space missions. Institute of Electrical and Electronics Engineers. May 24, 2004. Retrieved May 28, 2022.
- David Henriquez, Timothy Canham, Johnny Chang, and Elihu McMahon. Workstation-Based Avionics Simulator to Support Mars Science Laboratory Flight Software Development. June 15, 2012. Retrieved May 27, 2022.
- Garth Watney, Leonard J. Reder, and Timothy Canham. Modeling for Partitioned and Multi-core Flight Software Systems: (Instrument Software Framework). Institute of Electrical and Electronics Engineers. December 11, 2014. Retrieved May 27, 2022.
- Bob Balaram, Timothy Canham, Courtney Duncan, Håvard F. Grip, Wayne Johnson, Justin Maki, Amelia Quon, Ryan Stern and David Zhu. Mars Helicopter Technology Demonstrator. Aerospace Research Central. January 7, 2018. Retrieved May 27, 2022.
- Robert Bocchino, Timothy Canham, Garth Watney, Leonard Reder, and Jeffrey Levison. F Prime: An Open-Source Framework for Small-Scale Flight Software Systems. Utah State University. July 19, 2018. Retrieved May 27, 2022.
- Canham, Timothy. Mars Helicopter: Leveraging Commercial Hardware and Open Source Software. 2019. Retrieved May 27, 2022.

== Lectures ==
- Farah Alibay and Timothy Canham. Helicopters in Space (live public talk). Jet Propulsion Laboratory. March 11, 2021. Retrieved May 27, 2022.

== See also ==
- MiMi Aung, Ingenuity project manager
- Bob Balaram, Ingenuity chief engineer
- Håvard Fjær Grip, Ingenuity chief pilot
