= Fredrik Møller =

Fredrik Møller may refer to:

- Fredrik Møller (engineer)
- Fredrik Møller (alpine skier)
