= RIMFAX =

Mars rover-bound radar imager

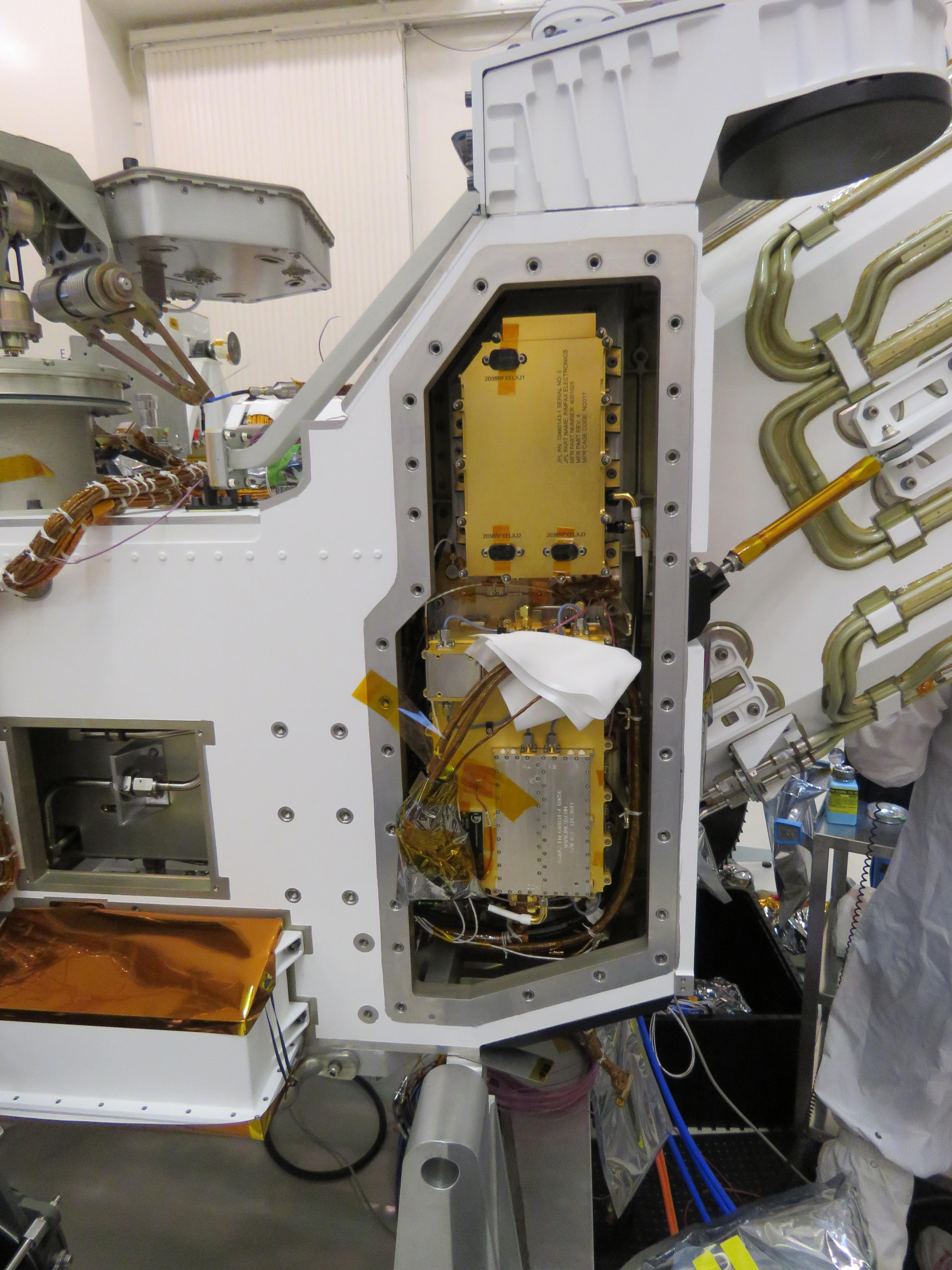
- RIMFAX radar imager
- Operator: NASA
- Manufacturer: Norwegian Defence Research Establishment
- Instrument type: Ground-penetrating radar
- Function: Study subsurface structure

Properties
- Mass: 3 kg (6.6 lb)
- Dimensions: 19.6 × 12.0 × 0.66 cm
- Power consumption: Max: 10 watts
- Resolution: 15 cm to 30 cm (3" to 12")

Host spacecraft
- Spacecraft: Perseverance
- Operator: NASA
- Launch date: 30 July 2020, 11:50:00 UTC
- Rocket: Atlas V
- Launch site: Cape Canaveral, SLC-41
- COSPAR ID: 2020-052A

The Radar Imager for Mars' subsurface experiment (RIMFAX) is a ground-penetrating radar on NASA's Perseverance rover, part of the Mars 2020 mission. It uses radar waves to see geologic features under the surface.

The device can detect features dozens of meters/yards underground, such as buried sand dunes or lava features.

RIMFAX takes its name from Hrímfaxi, the horse in Norse mythology that "faithfully brings the night."

The radar operates at radio frequencies of 150–1200 MHz and uses a Bow-Tie Slot antenna.

== Overview ==
RIMFAX is a ground-penetrating radar; its antenna is located on the lower rear of the Perseverance rover. It can image different ground densities, structural layers, buried rocks, meteorites, and detect underground water ice and salty brine at 10 m (33 ft) depth.

Ground-penetrating radars (GPR) send radio frequency electromagnetic waves into the ground and then detect the reflected signals as a function of time to reveal subsurface structure as well as composition. RIMFAX is based on a number of GPR instruments developed at the Norwegian Defence Research Establishment (FFI). RIMFAX was selected by NASA to be one of the instruments on the Mars 2020 rover in July 2014. RIMFAX enables the science team to assess shallow layers and their stratigraphic relationships with nearby outcrops, thereby providing a window into the geological and associated environmental history.

The RIMFAX instrument was developed and built by FFI and delivered to NASA's Jet Propulsion Laboratory for integration with the rover in December 2018. Due to Mars's 24.5-hour day, RIMFAX operations are shared between the University of California, Los Angeles (UCLA) and the University of Oslo (UiO), with the rotation every two weeks. The RIMFAX data is archived by NASA's Planetary Data System. The RIMFAX principal investigator is Svein-Erik Hamran of FFI, and his team includes scientists from Norway, Canada and the United States.

== Specifications ==
RIMFAX employs a gated Frequency Modulated Continuous Wave (FMCW) waveform to probe the subsurface. Gated FMCW uses a single antenna for both transmission and reception, quickly switching it between the transmitter and receiver modes. RIMFAX is commanded to acquire radar soundings every 10–20 cm along the rover's path to create two-dimensional GPR images of subsurface structure.

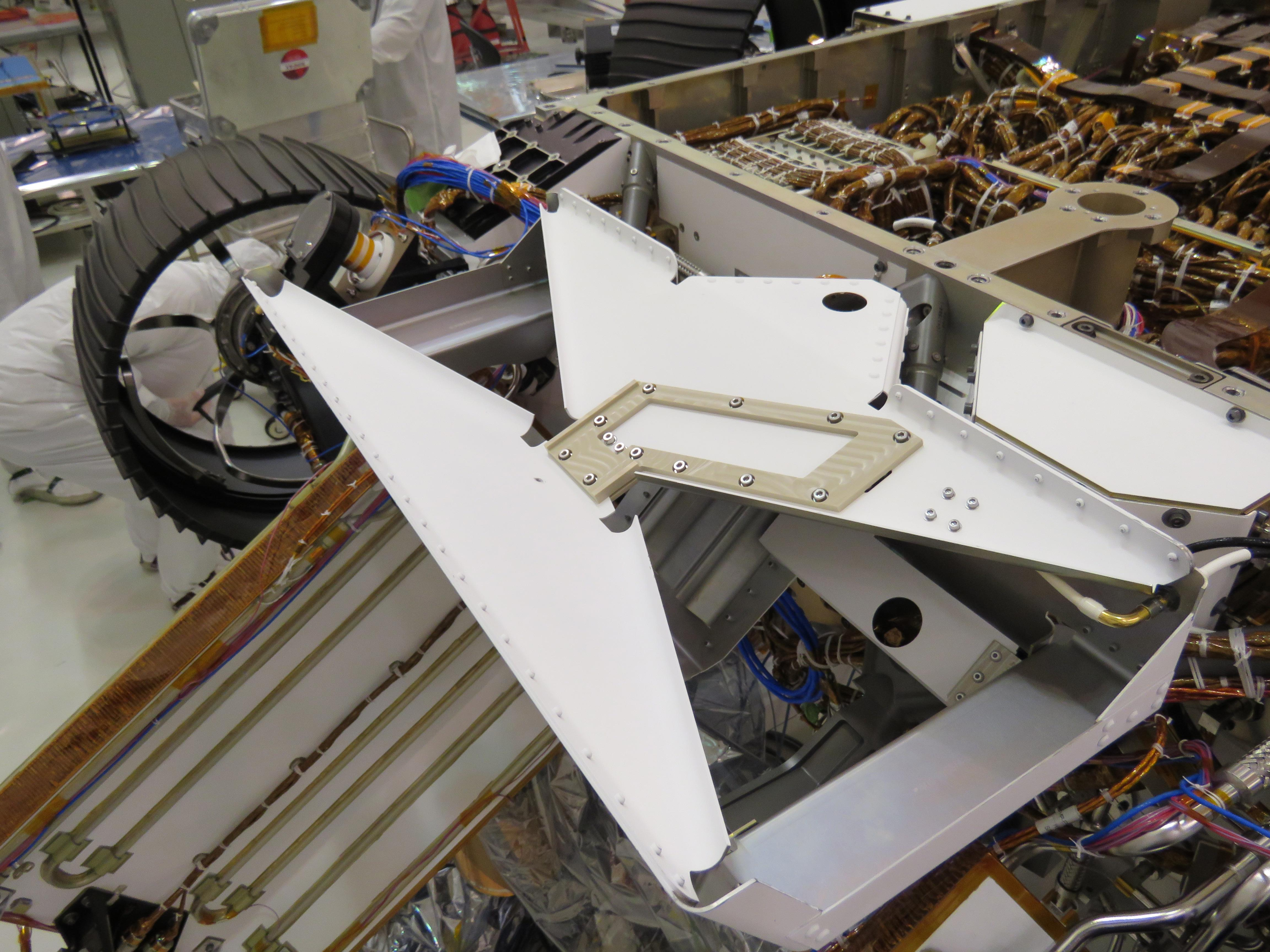
RIMFAX – Bow-Tie Slot antenna

Specifications	Units/performance
Mass	3 kg (6.6 lb)
Power	5 to 10 watts
Dimensions	19.6 × 12.0 × 0.66 cm (7.0" × 4.7" × 2.4")
Data return	5 to 10 kbytes per sounding location
Frequency range	150 to 1200 MHz
Vertical resolution	15 cm to 30 cm (6" to 12")
Penetration depth	≤ 10 m (33 ft)
Measurement interval	Every 10 cm (3.9 in)

== Development ==
An engineering model of RIMFAX was tested at several locations, primarily in Svalbard and the US Southwest. Modelling was carried out with gprMax, an open source electromagnetic simulation tool, to assess the imaging potential at the landing site. During development, a detection range of about 10 yards/meters was targeted, and tests on glaciers were successful.

== Contemporaries ==
Other Mars radar experiments include SHARAD, MARSIS, and WISDOM.

== See also ==
- Space-based radar
