= SHARAD =

Radar on the Mars Reconnaissance Orbiter

Schematic view of SHARAD operation on Mars Reconnaissance Orbiter

SHARAD (Mars SHAllow RADar sounder) is a subsurface sounding radar embarked on the Mars Reconnaissance Orbiter (MRO) probe. It complements the MARSIS radar on Mars Express orbiter, providing lower penetration capabilities (some hundred meters) but much finer resolution of 15 meters in free space.

SHARAD was developed under the responsibility of the Italian Space Agency (ASI, Agenzia Spaziale Italiana), and provided to JPL for use on board NASA's Mars Reconnaissance Orbiter spacecraft in the frame of a NASA/ASI agreement which foresees exploitation of the data by a joint Italian/US team. The INFOCOM dept. of the University of Sapienza University of Rome is responsible for the instrument operations, while Thales Alenia Space Italia (formerly Alenia Spazio) designed and built the instruments. SHARAD operations are managed by INFOCOM from the SHARAD Operation Centre (SHOC), located within the Alcatel Alenia Space facilities in the suburbs of Rome.

== Science objectives ==
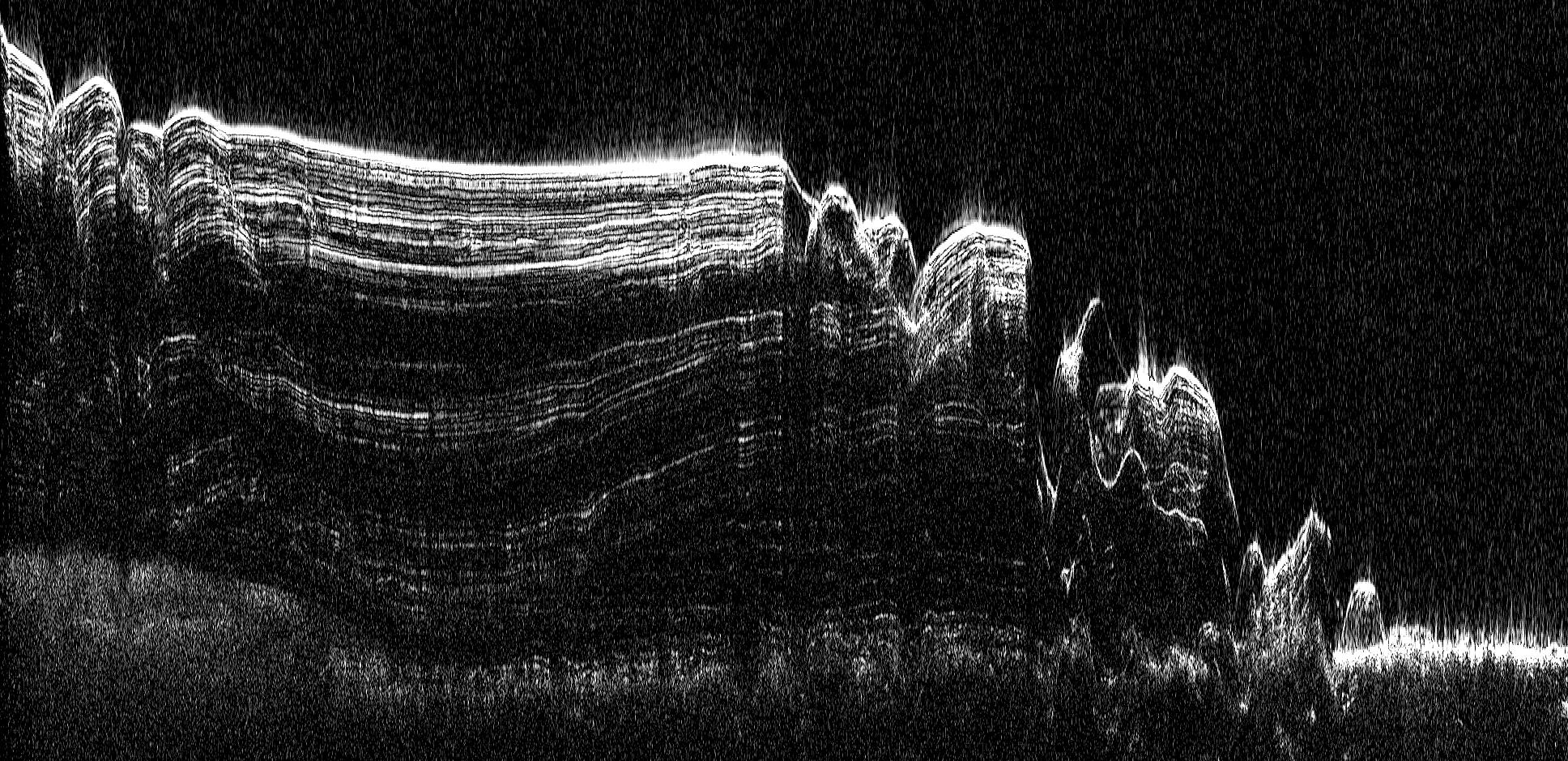
Radargram of north pole layered deposits from SHARAD shallow ground-penetrating radar on Mars Reconnaissance Orbiter

SHARAD is intended to map the first kilometer below the Mars surface, providing images of subsurface scattering layers with high vertical resolution (15 m), with the intent to locate water/ice deposits and to map the vertical structure of the upper subsurface layers.

== Characteristics ==
SHARAD operates on a carrier frequency of 20 MHz, transmitting a "chirped" signal with a bandwidth of 10 MHz. Pulsewidth is 85 μs and the nominal Pulse Repetition Frequency is 700.28 Hz. Transmitted power is 10 W peak. The antenna is a 10 m dipole. A synthetic aperture is generated on-ground to reduce the unwanted surface returns from off-nadir scatterers at the same range of the subsurface echoes.

SHARAD is physically divided into two elements:

- the SEB (SHARAD electronic box), which contains all the electronics (instrument controller, transmitter, receiver and antenna impedance matching network), within a metal frame which acts as thermal radiator for the electronic modules inside (Mars Reconnaissance Orbiter is an open frame spacecraft, and SHARAD has an autonomous thermal control)
- the antenna, made by two fiber tubes, folded and stowed in a cradle (covered by thermal insulator to protect it from the heating induced by the aerobraking). Once released, the antenna extends into position thanks only to the elastic property of the material. A metal wire running inside the non-conductive tubes represents the real radiating element of the antenna. The antenna was designed and manufactured by Northrop Grumman Astro Aerospace in Carpinteria, CA.

The instrument operates at fixed PRF (700.28 Hz) and the echo is received in rank 1 (i.e., after the second transmitted pulse). Two alternate (higher and lower) PRF are available to deal with the extended mission orbit range. An open-loop tracking system, based on a prior knowledge of the surface topography, is the nominal means to position the 135 μs receive window on the expected echo position (a closed-loop tracker is available as backup).

The instrument on-board signal processing is minimal, and consists of a coherent presumption of the received echoes (programmable between 1 and 32 in power of 2 steps) to reduce the generated data rate, with programmable number of bits (8, 6, 4).

The chirp signal is generated directly on the 20 MHz carrier by a digital chirp generator and fed to the power amplifier, followed by a Transmit/Receive switch and the matching network. The receiver provides amplification, filtering and digital gain control directly at RF, and the digitised using an undersampling technique at a rate of 26.6 MHz. A single digital signal processor provides both the control and processing function.

The instrument industrial team is composed as follows:

- Instrument design, integration and test: Alcatel Alenia Space Italia (Rome plant)
- DES (Digital electronics subsystem): Alcatel Alenia Space Italia (Milan plant - formerly Laben)
- Chirp Generator, Receiver: Alcatel Alenia Space Italia (Rome/L'Aquila plants)
- Transmitter, matching network: Galileo Avionica (Milan, Italy)
- Antenna: Astro Aerospace (Carpinteria, CA, USA)

== History ==
While the initial studies date back to 2001, full-scale development was released only in February 2003. The Engineering Model (EM) of the instrument was delivered to Lockheed Martin Space Systems in Denver (responsible for the spacecraft) in March 2004, and integrated into the Orbiter Test Bed. The ProtoFlight Model (PFM) was delivered and integrated on the Mars Reconnaissance Orbiter in Denver in September 2004. Mars Reconnaissance Orbiter was launched from Cape Canaveral Air Force Station on August 12, 2005, with an Atlas V-Centaur launch vehicle, and reached Mars orbit on March 10, 2006. The aerobraking phase, needed to reach the operational orbit, lasted until August 30, 2006. On September 17, 2006, the SHARAD antenna was deployed, and the first in-flight test of the radar was successfully carried out on September 19. SHARAD has been operational since November 2006.

== Findings ==
The SHARAD radar penetrated the north polar layered ice deposits of Mars and revealed a relatively small (about 100 meter) maximum deflection of the underlying rock, which suggests a strong lithosphere greater than 300 kilometers thick. Radar results consistent with massive deposits of water ice in middle latitudes support a debris-covered glacier hypothesis.

On November 22, 2016, NASA reported finding a large amount of underground ice in the Utopia Planitia region of Mars using SHARAD. The volume of water detected has been estimated to be equivalent to the volume of water in Lake Superior.

Mars - Utopia Planitia
Scalloped terrain led to the discovery of a large amount of underground ice
enough water to fill Lake Superior (November 22, 2016)

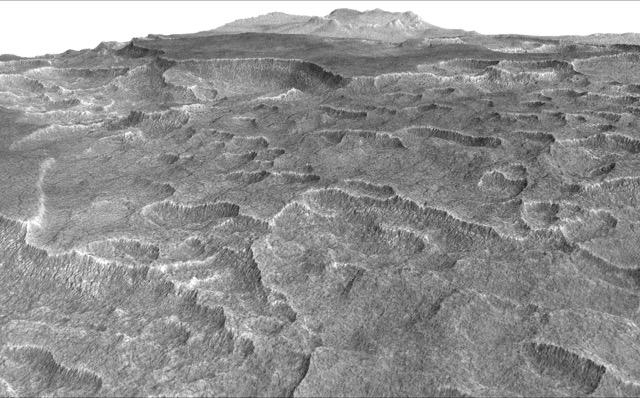
Martian terrain

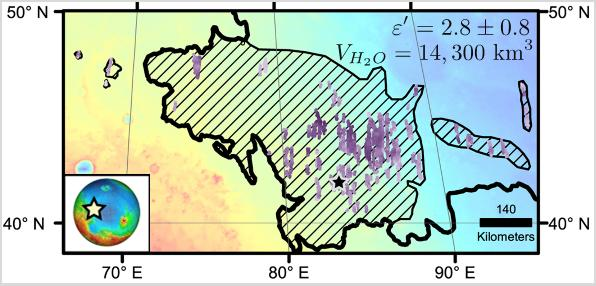
Map of terrain

The calculations for the volume of water ice in the region were based on measurements from SHARAD, the ground-penetrating radar instrument on the Mars Reconnaissance Orbiter (MRO).

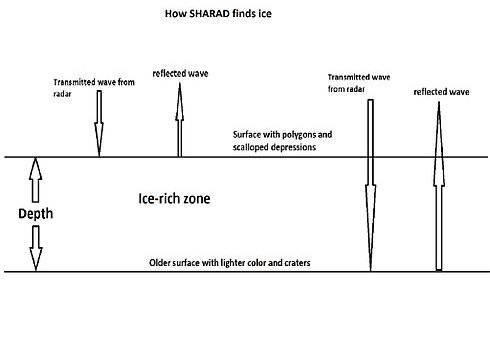
SHARAD finds ice by measuring its radar returns from the surface and from a deeper lower surface. The depth to the lower surface was found from HiRISE images of gaps in the surface.

SHARAD radar data when combined to form a 3D model reveal buried craters in the north polar cap. These may be used to date certain layers.

Research, published in April 2011, described a large deposit of frozen carbon dioxide near the south pole. Most of this deposit probably enters Mars' atmosphere when the planet's tilt increases. When this occurs, the atmosphere thickens, winds get stronger, and larger areas on the surface can support liquid water. After more analysis, it was discovered that if these deposits were all changed into gas, the atmospheric pressure on Mars doubles. There are three layers of these deposits; each are capped with a 30-meter layer of water ice that prevents the CO_{2} from sublimating into the atmosphere. In sublimation a solid material goes directly into a gas phase. These three layers are linked to periods when the atmosphere collapsed when the climate changed.

== See also ==
- LRS, Lunar radar sounder (LRS) is a orbiting low frequency radar sounder and altimeter over Earth's Moon
- MARSIS, Mars Advanced Radar for Subsurface and Ionosphere Sounding (MARSIS) is a orbiting low frequency radar sounder and altimeter over Mars
- RIME, Radar for Icy Moons Exploration (RIME) is a orbiting low frequency radar sounder and altimeter for Jupiter's Icy moons
- Tianwen-1, The Tianwen-1 mission plans an Orbiter Subsurface Radar (OSR) and rover based Ground-Penetrating Radar (GPR) for Mars
- WISDOM (radar), Water Ice and Subsurface Deposit Observation on Mars (WISDOM) is a ground-penetrating radar on the ExoMars rover
