= Mars Orbiter Laser Altimeter =

Instrument on the Mars Global Surveyor spacecraft

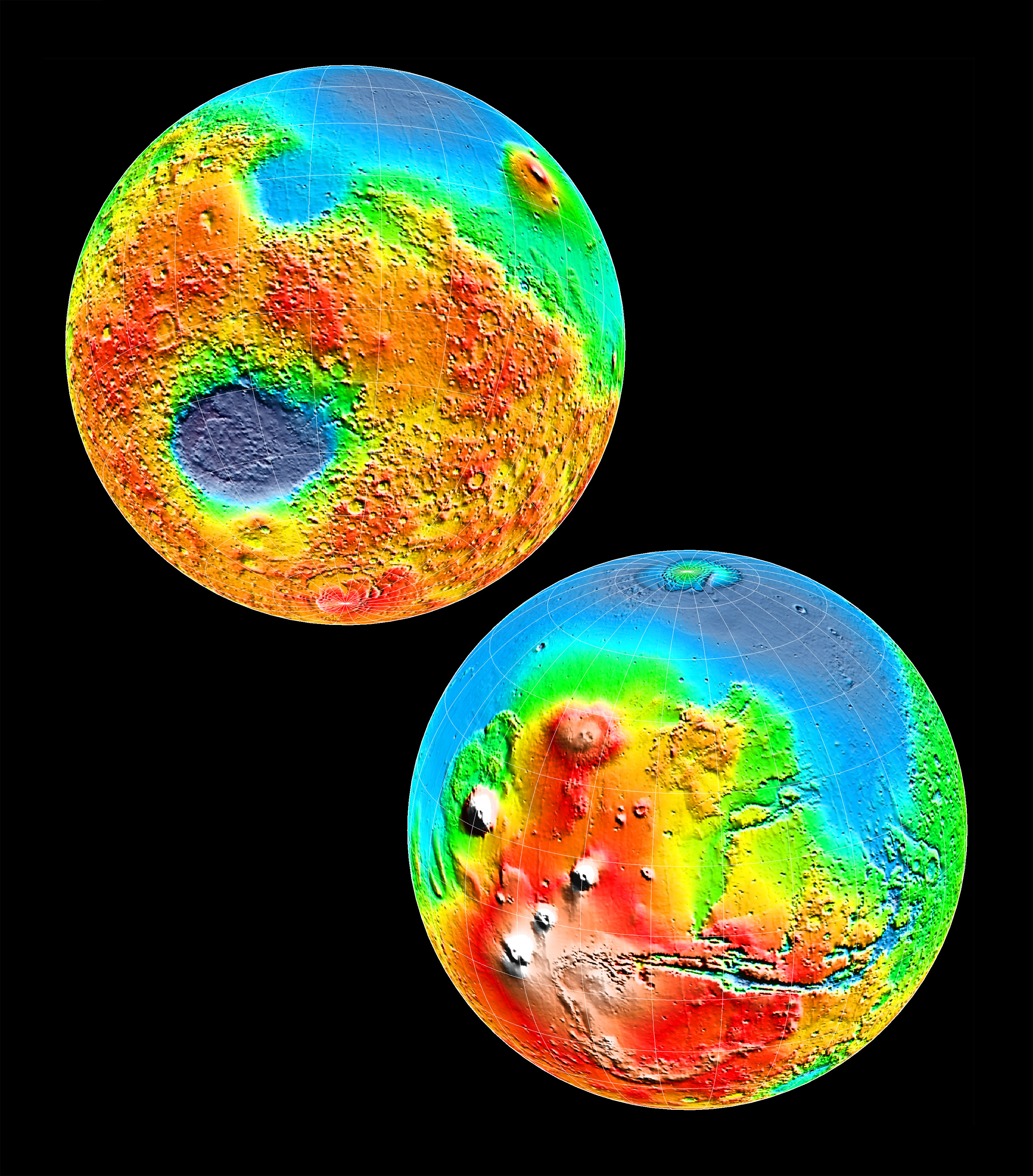
MOLA topographic images of the two hemispheres of Mars. This image appeared on the cover of Science magazine in May 1999.

The Mars Orbiter Laser Altimeter (MOLA) was one of five instruments on the Mars Global Surveyor (MGS) spacecraft, which operated in Mars orbit from September 1997 to November 2006. However, the MOLA instrument transmitted altimetry data only until June 2001. The MOLA instrument transmitted infrared laser pulses towards Mars at a rate of 10 times per second and measured the time of flight to determine the range (distance) of the MGS spacecraft to the Martian surface. The range measurements resulted in precise topographic maps of Mars. The precision maps are applicable to studies in geophysics, geology and atmospheric circulation. MOLA also functioned as a passive radiometer and measured the radiance of the surface of Mars at 1064 nanometers.

== Planetary laser altimetry ==
STL 3D model of Mars with 20× elevation exaggeration using MOLA data

A laser altimeter is an instrument that measures the distance from an orbiting spacecraft to the surface of the planet or asteroid that the spacecraft is orbiting. The distance is determined by measuring the complete round trip time of a laser pulse from the instrument to the body's surface, and back to the instrument.

The distance to the object can be determined by multiplying the round-trip pulse time by the speed of light and dividing it by two. With a known attitude and position of the instrument or spacecraft, the location on the surface, which is illuminated by the laser pulse can be determined. The series of the laser spot, or footprint, locations provides a profile of the surface.

== Pole-to-pole view ==

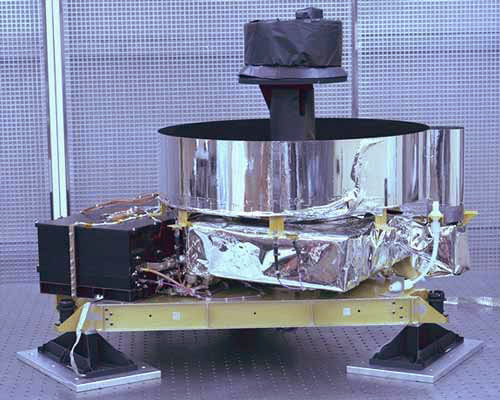
The MOLA instrument

Above is a pole-to-pole view of Martian topography from the first MOLA global topographic model [Smith et al., Science, 1999]. The slice runs from the north pole (left) to the south pole (right) along the 0° longitude line. The figure highlights the pole-to-pole slope of 0.036°, such that the south pole has a higher elevation than the north pole from NASA Goddard Flight Center web site.

== See also ==
- Protoflight
