= Farouk El-Baz =

Egyptian-American space scientist (born 1938)

OME Farouk El-Baz
- فاروق الباز
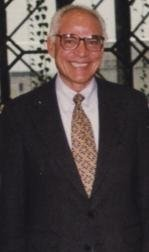
- Born: January 2, 1938 (age 88); Zagazig, Egypt
- Citizenship: Egypt; United States
- Education: Ain Shams University; Missouri University of Science and Technology
- Known for: Project Apollo
- Awards: NASA's Apollo Achievement Award; Exceptional Scientific Achievement Medal; Certificate of Merit of the World Aerospace Education Organization; Republic of Egypt Order of Merit - First Class; 1989 Outstanding Achievement Award of the Egyptian American Organization; 1991 Golden Door Award of the International Institute of Boston; 2026 National Air and Space Museum Trophy
- Scientific career
- Fields: Geology
- Workplaces: NASA; Boston University

Farouk El-Baz (Arabic: فاروق الباز, Egyptian Arabic pronunciation: [fɑˈruːʔ elˈbæːz, fæˈruːʔ]; born January 2, 1938) is an Egyptian-American space scientist and geologist, who worked with NASA in the scientific exploration of the Moon and the planning of the Apollo program. He was a leading geologist on the program, responsible for studying the geology of the Moon, the selection of landing sites for the Apollo missions, and the training of astronauts in lunar observations and photography. He played a key role in the Apollo 11 Moon landing mission, and later Apollo missions. He also came up with the idea of touchable Moon rocks at a museum, inspired by his childhood pilgrimage to Mecca where he touched the Black Stone (which in Islam is believed to be sent down from the heavens).

He is married, has four daughters, and has seven grandchildren. He was a Senior Advisor to Egypt's former president Hosni Mubarak.

El-Baz was a Research Professor and Director of the Center for Remote Sensing at Boston University in Boston, Massachusetts. He was an adjunct professor of Geology at the Faculty of Science, Ain Shams University, Cairo, Egypt. He has since now retired but his work remains timeless and well regarded at the university

He is also a member of the Board of Trustees of the Geological Society of America Foundation, Boulder, Colorado, and a member of the Board of Directors of CRDF Global. He was also elected a member of the U.S. National Academy of Engineering in Washington, DC (2002) for selecting the landing sites for the Apollo missions, and for pioneering methods of discovering subsurface freshwater from space observations.

== Biography ==
Farouk El-Baz was born on January 2, 1938, in Zagazig, Sharqia Governorate to Muslim Egyptian parents. His family is originally from the Nile Delta village of Touqh el Aklaam, El Senbellawein Centre, Dakahlia Governorate.

=== Education ===
Farouk went to many schools. In 1958, he attended Ain Shams University. In 1961, he received a Master of Science in geology from the Missouri School of Mines and Metallurgy (now Missouri University of Science and Technology). From 1962-1963, he attended Massachusetts Institute of Technology. After that, in 1964, he attended Missouri University of Science and Technology. Finally, in 2002, he attended Missouri University of Science and Technology again.

In 1964, at the age of 26, he received a Doctor of Philosophy in geology from the Missouri University of Science and Technology after conducting research from 1962 to 1963 at the Massachusetts Institute of Technology.

== Achievements ==
In 1978, El-Baz was appointed Science Adviser to President Anwar Sadat of Egypt. He was charged with the selection of regions for land reclamation in the desert without detrimental effects on the environment. For his distinguished service, President Sadat awarded him Egypt's Order of Merit - First Class.

- In 1989, he earned an Honorary Doctor of Science from New England College.
- In 2002, he earned a professional degree from the Missouri University of Science and Technology.
- In 2003, he received an Honorary Doctor of Philosophy from Mansoura University.
- In 2004, he earned a Doctor of Laws from the American University in Cairo.
- Also, in 2004, he received an Honorary Doctor of Engineering from the Missouri University of Science and Technology.

== Post-doctorate period ==
El-Baz taught Geology at Assiut University, Egypt (1958–1960) and the Heidelberg University, Germany (1964–1965). He joined the Pan American - U.A.R. Oil Company in 1966, where he participated in the discovery of El-Morgan, the first offshore oil field in the Gulf of Suez.

== The NASA period ==
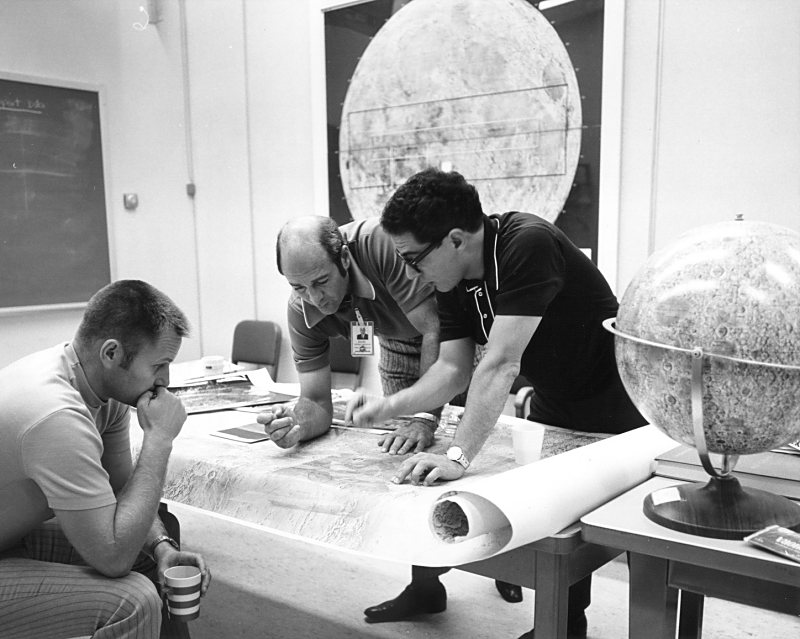
El-Baz (right) training Ronald Evans and Robert Overmyer

A scientist who helped NASA plan and identify the Moon landing location for Apollo 11 historic Moon landing in 1969, El-Baz is currently an expert in the study of deserts and how to find and sustain water in such environments in the Arab world.

From 1967 to 1972, El-Baz participated in the Apollo Program as Supervisor of Lunar Science Planning at Bellcomm Inc., a division of AT&T that conducted systems analysis for NASA. During these six years, he was Secretary of the Landing Site Selection Committee for the Apollo lunar landing missions, Principal Investigator of Visual Observations and Photography, and Chairman of the Astronaut Training Group. In addition to being the scientist who played a key role in helping NASA decide on the ideal Moon landing site for the Apollo 11 mission in 1969, El-Baz also served on the Apollo 15 rover mission in 1971. Throughout his time in the Apollo program, El-Baz joined NASA officials in briefing members of the press on the results of the lunar missions. His ability to simplify scientific jargon made his remarks on the program's scientific accomplishments often quoted by the media.

Soon after beginning with the Apollo Program, he was put to work poring over mountains of detailed photographs of the Moon's surface—a crucial step in selecting the most ideal and precise landing location based on lunar terrain, climate variations, and other factors. He also performed the same role for the famous Apollo 15 Lunar Roving Vehicle rover mission, and trained Apollo astronauts in the important skills of visual observation and space photography, in addition to instructing crew members on which rocks to collect and how to collect lunar soil. So pivotal was he to Apollo that in Tom Hanks' HBO TV-series, From the Earth to the Moon, El-Baz's role as an Apollo scientist and astronaut trainer was featured in a segment entitled, "The Brain of Farouk El-Baz," and a shuttle craft named El-Baz soared through the popular TV-series Star Trek: The Next Generation.

His outstanding teaching abilities were confirmed by the Apollo astronauts. While orbiting the Moon for the first time during Apollo 15, Command Module Pilot Alfred Worden said, "After the King's [Farouk's nickname] training, I feel like I've been here before."

== The Post-Apollo period ==
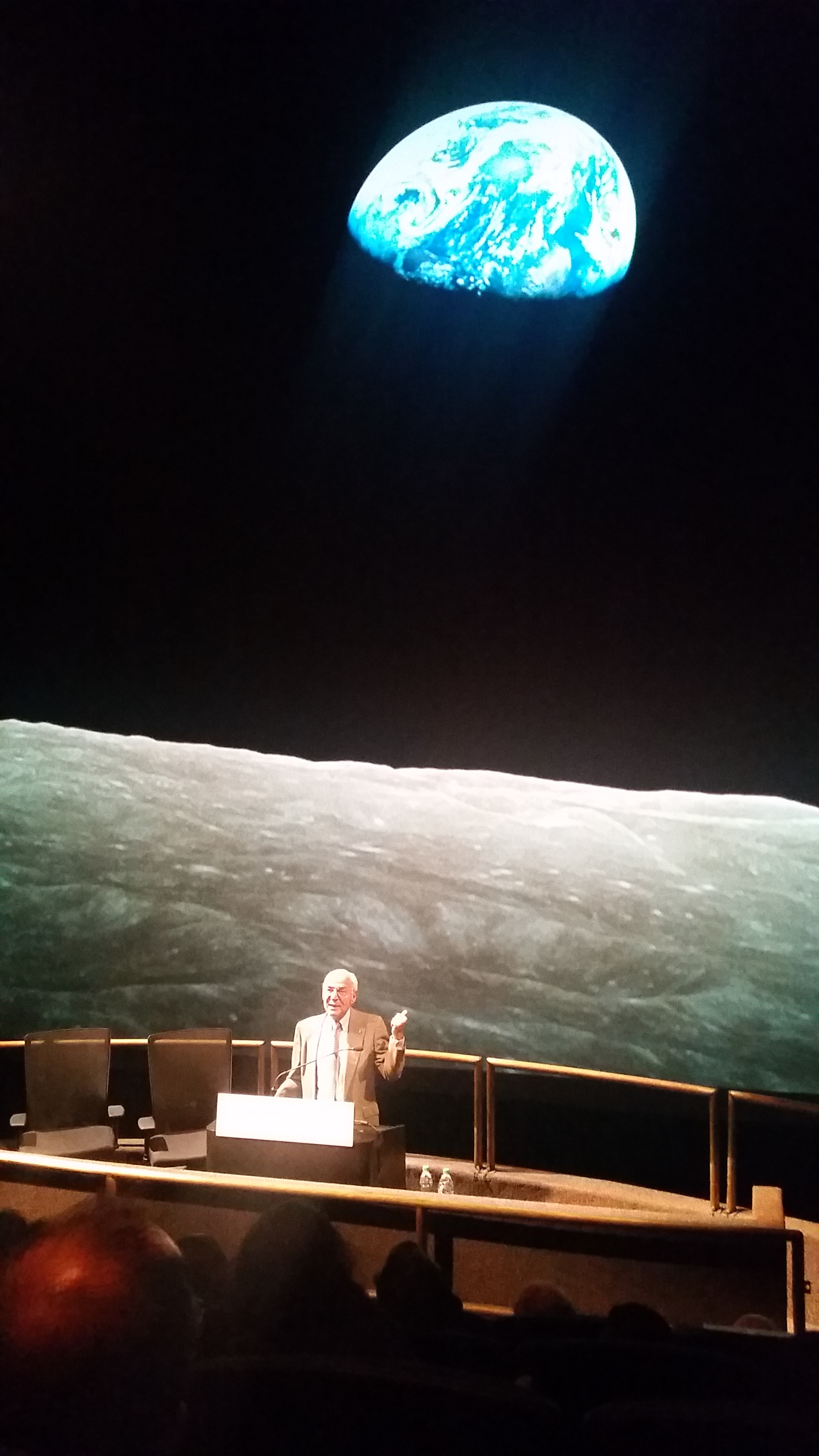
El-Baz giving a lecture on his role in the Apollo program at the National Air and Space Museum in 2019, with the Earthrise photo from Apollo 8 in the background.

After the Apollo Program ended in 1972, El-Baz joined the Smithsonian Institution in Washington DC to establish and direct the Center for Earth and Planetary Studies at the National Air and Space Museum. At the same time, he was elected as a member of the Lunar Nomenclature Task Group of the International Astronomical Union. In this capacity, he continues to participate in naming features of the Moon as revealed by lunar photographic missions.

In 1973, NASA selected him as principal investigator of the Earth Observations and Photography Experiment on the Apollo-Soyuz Test Project (ASTP), the first joint American-Soviet space mission in July 1975. Emphasis was placed on photographing arid environments, particularly the Great Sahara of North Africa and the Arabian Peninsula, in addition to other features of the Earth and its oceans.

Emphasizing the study of the origin and evolution of arid landscapes, he collected field data during visits to every major desert in the world. One of his significant journeys took place soon after the United States and China had normalized relations in 1979, when he coordinated the first visit by American scientists to the deserts of northwestern China. The six-week journey was chronicled in National Geographic and Explorers Journal. His research on the origin and evolution of the desert resulted in his election as Fellow of the American Association for the Advancement of Science (AAAS).

From 1982 until he joined Boston University in 1986, he was vice president of Itek Optical Systems of Lexington, Massachusetts. During these years he supervised the utilization of the Space Shuttle's Large Format Camera photographs.

El-Baz was elected Fellow of the Geological Society of America, The World Academy of Sciences (TWAS), and of the National Academy of Engineering (USA). In 1999, the Geological Society of America Foundation (GSAF) established the Farouk El-Baz Award for Desert Research, to annually reward excellence in arid land studies. In 2007 the GSAF also established the Farouk El-Baz Student Research Award to encourage desert research.

In April 2011, he joined the liberal Free Egyptians Party, founded by the telecommunications tycoon Naguib Sawiris.

== Desert research and theories ==
In 1986 El-Baz joined Boston University as director of its Center for Remote Sensing, set up to apply space technology in archaeology, geography and geology, and NASA designated the center a Center of Excellence in Remote Sensing in 1997. He is listed as its founding director. Since joining Boston University in 1986, El-Baz has used satellite images to study the origin and evolution of desert landforms. He is credited with providing evidence that the desert is not man-made, but the result of major climatic variations. His research uncovered numerous sand-buried rivers and streams in the Sahara based on the interpretation of radar images.

These former water courses lead into depressions in the terrain, which he theorized must contain groundwater. His analysis of these data resulted in the location of groundwater in the arid terrains of Egypt, Oman, and the United Arab Emirates (U.A.E.), and perhaps Darfur in Sudan (unless it dried up).

=== Kuwait River ===
El-Baz piqued the interest of Biblical scholars around the world with his announcement of paleo-drainage from Arabian Peninsula into the Persian Gulf. The idea that a river once flowed across the deserts of Arabia, and somehow connected with the Tigris and/or Euphrates Rivers, draws its evidence from satellite datasets, especially from the radar images taken during the 1994 mission of the Space Shuttle Endeavour. El-Baz studied the images, and noticed that traces of a defunct river that emerged from Kuwait and crossed northern Arabia from west to east were visible beneath the sands, thanks to the ground-penetrating capabilities of the radar technologies.

He called it the Kuwait River, which is more popularly known as Wadi Al-Batin, an extension of Wadi Al-Rummah. The Wadi Al-Batin river system would have been responsible for deposition of the Dib DiBa Formation (similar to an alluvial fan deposit, both morphologically and sedimentologically). This river system may have been active 2500–3000 BC.

=== Giza pyramid theory ===
In a National Geographic documentary film in 2002, El-Baz proposed a new source for the shape of The Pyramids at Giza. El-Baz believes that the ancient Egyptians chose to bury their dead in pyramid shaped structures because they knew from an earlier nomadic life that monumental pyramidal landforms, which abound in the Western Desert of Egypt, evade erosion.

== Awards and honors ==
- He is the recipient of numerous honors and awards, including the Golden Door Award of the International Institute of Boston, the Nevada Medal of the Desert Research Institute, and the Pioneer Award of the Arab Thought Foundation. In 2009 the Carnegie Corporation of New York named him one of its Great Immigrants honorees.
- Asteroid 7371 El-Baz, discovered by American astronomers Eleanor Helin and Schelte Bus at Palomar Observatory in 1978, was named in his honor. The official naming citation was published by the Minor Planet Center on 27 August 2019 (M.P.C. 115893).
- The Enterprise-D shuttlecraft "El-Baz" was named after him.

== Works ==
- Kosofsky, L. J.; El-Baz, Farouk (1970). The Moon as Viewed by Lunar Orbiter (PDF). Washington: NASA. hdl:2060/19700021506. LCCN 75601482. OCLC 85937. OL 4852460M. SP-200. Archived (PDF) from the original on March 23, 2024.
- El-Baz, Farouk; Warner, D. M., eds. (1979). Apollo-Soyuz Test Project - Summary Science Report (PDF). Vol. II: Earth Observations and Photography. NASA. hdl:2060/19800002294. LCCN 77011892. OCLC 3223886. OL 4544381M. SP-412. Archived (PDF) from the original on January 8, 2026.
- El-Baz, Farouk; Maxwell, Ted A., eds. (1982). Desert landforms of southwest Egypt: A basis for comparison with Mars (PDF). NASA. hdl:2060/19830008725. LCCN 83601194. OCLC 10374962. OL 2816388M. CR-3611. Archived (PDF) from the original on May 7, 2024.
- El-Baz, Farouk, ed. (1984). Deserts and arid lands. Remote Sensing of Earth Resources and Environment. Vol. 1. The Hague: Martinus Nijhoff Publishers/Springer Dordrecht. doi:10.1007/978-94-009-6080-0. ISBN 978-90-247-2850-3. LCCN 83008079. OCLC 9464846. OL 3166107M – via Internet Archive.
- El-Baz, Farouk; Makharita, R. M., eds. (1994). The Gulf War and the Environment. Amsterdam: Gordon & Breach Science Publishers. doi:10.4324/9781315621418. ISBN 9782881246494. LCCN 93049407. OCLC 29598213. OL 1436910M.
