= Svein-Erik Hamran =

Norwegian radar researcher

- Born: 22 September 1960 (age 65)
- Education: Norwegian University of Science and Technology; University of Tromsø
- Known for: RIMFAX, WISDOM (radar)
- Scientific career
- Institutions: Norwegian Defence Research Establishment; University of Oslo

Svein-Erik Hamran (born 1960) is a Norwegian professor in radar remote sensing at the University of Oslo. He led the development of the Radar Imager for Mars' subsurface experiment (RIMFAX) for the Mars rover Perservance as Principal Investigator for the Norwegian Defence Research Establishment (FFI), and is a Co-Principal Investigator for the WISDOM radar on the European Space Agency's Rosalind Franklin rover.

Hamran is the head of the University of Oslo's Centre for Space Sensors and Systems (CENSSS) at Kjeller.
