= Protoflight =

Protoflight is a portmanteau of "prototype" and "flight hardware". As defined by NASA Technical Standard NASA-STD-7002A, it refers to a strategy where no test-dedicated qualification article exists and all production (flight) hardware is intended for flight. An example of a program using protoflight methods is the Mars Orbiter Laser Altimeter project.

A protoflight approach carries a higher technical risk approach compared to a full qualification test program since it has no demonstrated life capability over the anticipated life cycle of the hardware, but is a technology development design process that utilizes higher risk tolerances, agile management practices, and quick responsiveness that are needed for certain prototype flight projects or missions.

== Examples ==
- Atmospheric Reentry Demonstrator
