= Norwegian Defence Research Establishment =

Research and development institute of the Norwegian Armed Forces

- Forsvarets forskningsinstitutt
- Motto: FFI turns knowledge and ideas into an effective defence
- Type: Research Establishment
- Established: April 11, 1946; 80 years ago
- Parent institution: Norwegian Ministry of Defence
- Director General: Kenneth Ruud
- Location: Kjeller, Norway
- Website: www.ffi.no

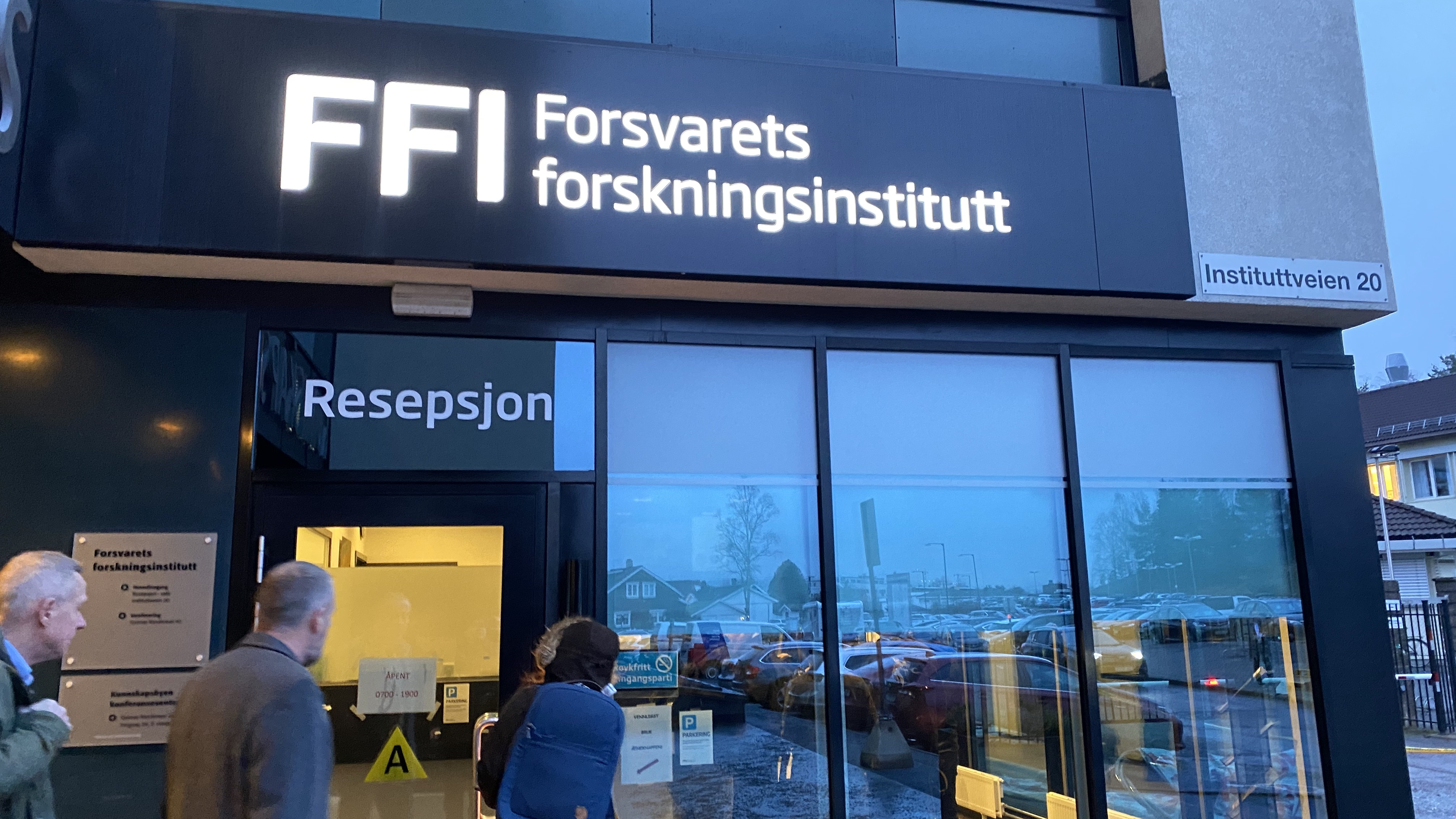
FFI in Kjeller, Norway

The Norwegian Defence Research Establishment (Forsvarets forskningsinstitutt – FFI) is a research institute that conducts research and development on behalf of the Norwegian Armed Forces and provides expert advice to political and military defence leaders. In particular, its task is to keep track of advances in the fields of science and military technology which might affect the assumptions on which Norwegian security policy and/or defence planning is based.

== History ==
The institute was established in 1946. Its roots lie in Norwegian participation in British scientific research during the Second World War (see Allied technological cooperation during World War II). Many Norwegian scientists and technologists took part during the period when Germany occupied Norway between 1940 and 1945.

FFI has 714 employees, of which approximately 360 are scientists and engineers. The main location of the institute is at Kjeller near Lillestrøm, 20 km east of the country's capital Oslo. The Kjeller area is a hub of research activity in south eastern Norway, with a total of some 2,400 people working at a variety of research establishments, colleges and university departments.

Part of the institute's Maritime Systems Division is situated in the coastal city of Horten, southwest of Oslo on the western side of the Oslofjord. Horten is known as the country's MEMS capital, and is also a centre of electronics and naval research and industry.

In way of concrete technology products, FFI is known for, among other things:

- The development of a range of computers in the early 1960s which eventually led to the creation of Norsk Data as well as Kongsberg Våpenfabrikk (KV)'s Computer Division: LYDIA (1962); SAM; SAM2.
- Beginning in 1973, NDRE was an early researcher of TCP/IP in Europe, based on a connection to SATNET through NORSAR, along with Peter Kirstein's group at University College London and RSRE in Britain.
- The development, with KV's Division of Guided Weapons, of the Penguin anti-ship missile
- The development of the Radar Imager for Mars' Subsurface Experiment (RIMFAX), an instrument aboard the Mars 2020 Perseverance rover that is a ground-penetrating radar designed to provide centimeter-scale resolution of the geologic structure of the planet subsurface.

== Researchers ==
- Brynjar Lia
- Torleiv Maseng
- Thomas Hegghammer
- Svein-Erik Hamran
- Anne Likuski (author of Al-Qaida After 9/11)

== Former researchers ==
- Fredrik Møller
- John Kristen Skogan
- Pål Spilling
- Ernst Sejersted Selmer

== See also ==
- Norwegian Institute of International Affairs
