= Fredrik Møller (engineer) =

Norwegian engineer

Fredrik Møller (21 March 1906 – 11 March 1971) was a Norwegian engineer, research administrator, entrepreneur, and industrialist. He was born in Fredrikstad, a son of Jørgen Emil Møller and Cornelia Louise Berckenhoff.

He participated in military research in the United Kingdom during World War II, and was among the founders of the Norwegian Defence Research Establishment, where he was appointed manager from 1947 to 1957. He was a central figure in the military industry in Norway, and was chairman of the board of Kongsberg Våpenfabrikk, Raufoss Ammunisjonsfabrikker and Marinens Hovedverft. He was decorated Knight, First Class of the Order of St. Olav in 1955.
