= John Safer =

American sculptor

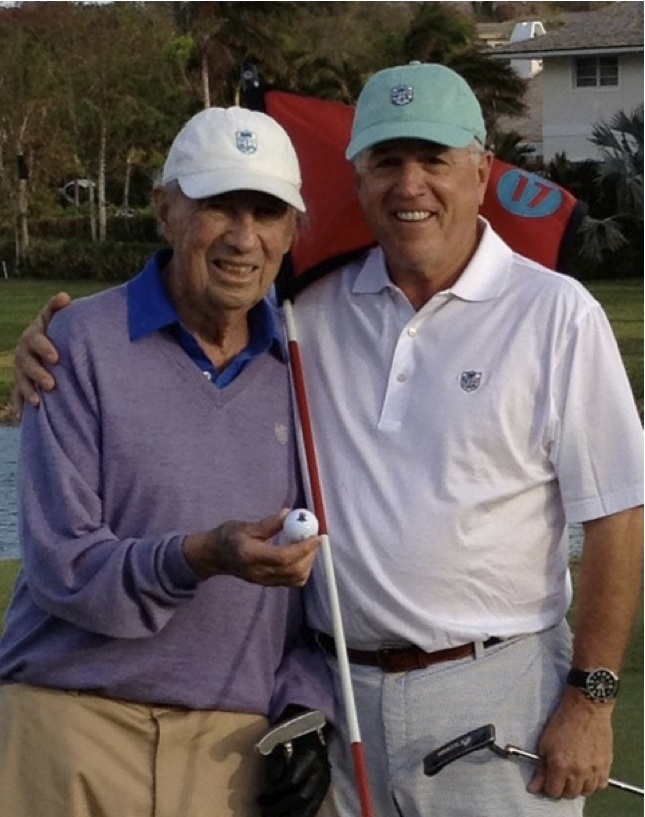
- Safer and Jack Frazee, 2012
- Born: John Safer; September 6, 1922; Washington, D.C., U.S.
- Died: 7 December 2018 (aged 96)
- Education: George Washington University; Harvard Law School
- Occupations: sculptor, entrepreneur
- Spouses: Susanne Arvay (m. 1950–1978) Joy Scott Safer (m. 1983)
- Children: Janine Whitney; Tom Safer; Kathryn Scott (step); Mark Scott (step)
- Website: www.johnsafer.com

John H. Safer (September 6, 1922 – December 7, 2018) was an American sculptor. Safer's varied career spanned work in theater lighting, television, real estate, politics and banking.

Safer was best known for his monumental sculptures, but he has also created many smaller works. These include sculptures for organizations such as the National Air and Space Museum, the PGA Tour, the Georgetown University Lombardi Cancer Center, the World Peace Foundation, and the Shakespeare Guild.

Safer's works stand in museums, galleries and embassies throughout the world. In 1972 and in 1989 the U.S. Department of State sent a group of Safer sculptures abroad to be exhibited as examples of American art. He died in December 2018 at the age of 96.

== Sculpture ==
Safer's earliest sculptures in the 1950s and 1960s were small works of Lucite. Over time he also began to work in bronze and stainless steel. The pieces became larger and in 1979 his first public commission, Judgment, a multi-ton patinated bronze, was installed at Harvard Law School in Cambridge, Massachusetts.

This was the first in a long string of public installations.

As the commissions grew in number they grew in size as well. Interplay, created in 1987, is 18 feet (5.5 m) high. Leading Edge, created in 1989, is 20 feet (6.1 m) high. His hallmark work, Ascent, which stands at the entrance of the Smithsonian Institution's Udvar-Hazy Center at Dulles Airport in Virginia, is 75 feet (23 m) high.

== Early life and education ==
John Safer was born and raised in Washington, D.C., the only child of John and Rebecca Herzmark Safer. His father, who operated a moving and storage business, was a lawyer who graduated from Georgetown University Law School at the head of his class. His mother Rebecca Herzmark Safer was a social activist, suffragette and intellectual. John learned to read and write by the age of four. At this time his mother entered him into first grade at the Maret French School.

Safer continued as a precocious student. Fluent in French, he entered high school at the age of eleven and graduated when he was fourteen. He was pressured by his mother to enroll at Harvard University. Safer, uncomfortable at the thought of being a fourteen-year-old college student, deliberately failed the Harvard entrance exam by handing in blank pages.

Safer instead attended Woodward Prep School. There he discovered his love for and ability in athletics. This theme would greatly influence his art and his life. Until then, his age and size had prevented him from participating in sports and left him with the sense that he was a misfit.

At the age of sixteen, Safer entered George Washington University where he majored in economics. He became an assistant to Professor Edward Acheson –– brother of the United States Secretary of State Dean Acheson –– who became a mentor. Later, Safer would be awarded two honorary degrees: Doctor of Philosophy from Daniel Webster College and Doctor of Literature from Lees-McRae College. In May 2009, Safer received a third honorary degree: Doctor of Fine Arts from George Washington University.

At the beginning of World War II, Safer enlisted in the United States Air Force to become a flying cadet. Safer became a first lieutenant and served in India, Burma and China. When the war ended in 1945 he opted for an additional year in the Air Force hoping to fulfill a dream of seeing Europe's great works of art while he was stationed there. His new assignment allowed him to visit the Parthenon, the Tate, and the Louvre. While in Rome, he learned that he was suddenly to be transferred to Athens. Unwilling to leave Italy without visiting the Accademia in Florence, Safer "borrowed" a jeep to make the drive to see Michelangelo's David. The Accademia was closed but he convinced the caretaker to let him in. The two hours Safer spent alone with the masterpiece resulted in a seminal experience, but it was Michelangelo's other sculptures in the Gallery, The Prisoners, which gave Safer an insight that was to impact his entire life and transform his artistic career. The Prisoners are heroic figures rising from rough hewn stone. The upper portion of the figures are finished while the lower part remains uncarved. As Safer studied The Prisoners he realized the power of the abstract –– a realization that gave direction to his future work.

== Businessman ==
After Safer graduated from Harvard Law School in 1949 his fascination with the emerging technology and promise of television prompted him to take a job as a handyman at WXEL in Cleveland, Ohio. He quickly rose to the position of program director. During this time his innovations led the new independent station to "beat the ratings of all the network affiliates."

In 1953 Safer's father became terminally ill and he returned to Washington, D.C. to take over his father's affairs. Although Safer successfully parlayed these into a major real estate development business he did not find his commercial life a rewarding one.

In 1974 Safer entered the world of banking, becoming chairman of the executive committee of Financial General Bankshares, and in 1981 the chairman of the board of DC National Bank, which later became part of Bank of America.

In 1999 Safer became chairman of the board of Materia, Inc. Materia specializes in Olefin metathesis and is noted for its Nobel Prize–winning green chemistry.

== Sculptor ==
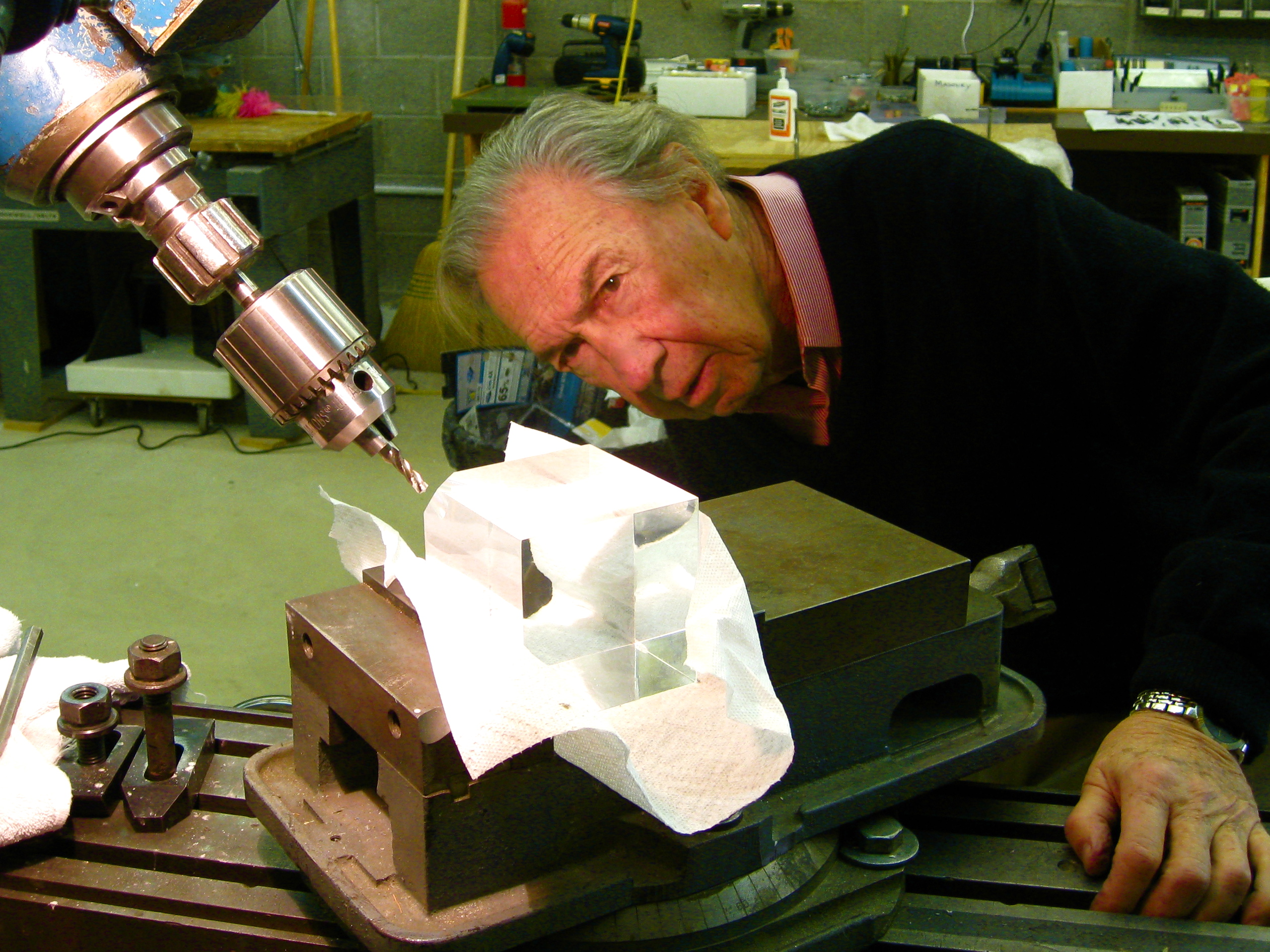
John Safer inspects Cube on Cube

Safer never formally studied art. His first forays into sculpture were experiments with plastic swizzle sticks. In 1957 he made his first creations, and he continued to experiment, eventually beginning to carve Lucite. In 1969 Safer had his first show in Pittsburgh, Pennsylvania at the Michael Berger Gallery. Several shows in private galleries followed with a major exhibition at the Pyramid Gallery in Washington, D.C.

In 1971 the renowned art collector and U.S. Ambassador to Great Britain, Walter Annenberg, invited Safer to have an exhibition at the American Embassy in London.

In 1972 President Gerald Ford presented Safer's Limits of Infinity to King Juan Carlos of Spain as a gift of state. This in turn led to several major events in Safer's sculptural career. As a result of a news report of President Ford's gift, the Dean of Harvard Law School sought to acquire a Safer sculpture for the school. This culminated in 1979 with the installation of Judgment, a monumental bronze work which was presented to Harvard Law School as a gift of Safer's class of 1949. This was Safer's first monumental public work.

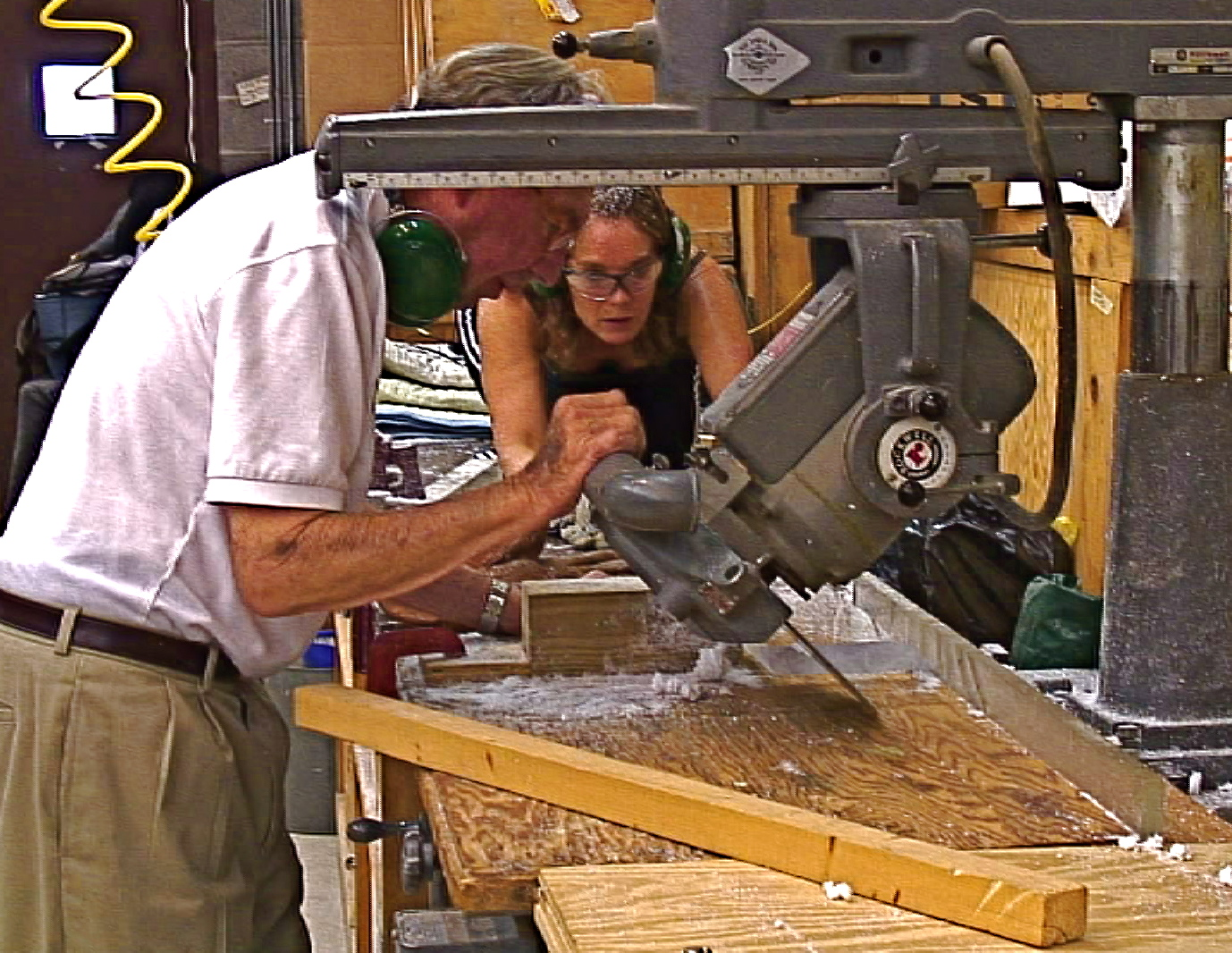
John Safer and Kathryn Scott work on Quest

John McArthur, the Dean of Harvard Business School visited the palace at Zarzuela where King Juan Carlos had installed Limits of Infinity. Moved by the sculpture, Dean McArthur returned to America and commissioned Safer's 20-foot-high (6.1 m) Search for Harvard Business School. The patinated bronze was installed on the Business School grounds in 1984 adjacent to the spot where Safer's daughter, Janine, received her MBA five days later.

In 1985 Safer was invited to exhibit sculpture in the Pioneers of Flight Hall at the Smithsonian Institution's National Air and Space Museum, in Washington, D.C. He has the distinction of being the only artist to have ever had an exhibition in the central gallery of the most visited museum in the world.

In 1989 the U.S. Department of State again sent Safer sculptures to Europe. As of 2008, the department has exhibited Safer sculpture in London, Paris, Beijing, Dublin, Bern, Lisbon, Brussels, Bucharest, Belgrade, Nassau, Washington, and New Deli. Both public and private exhibitions of Safer sculpture can be seen in venues throughout the world.

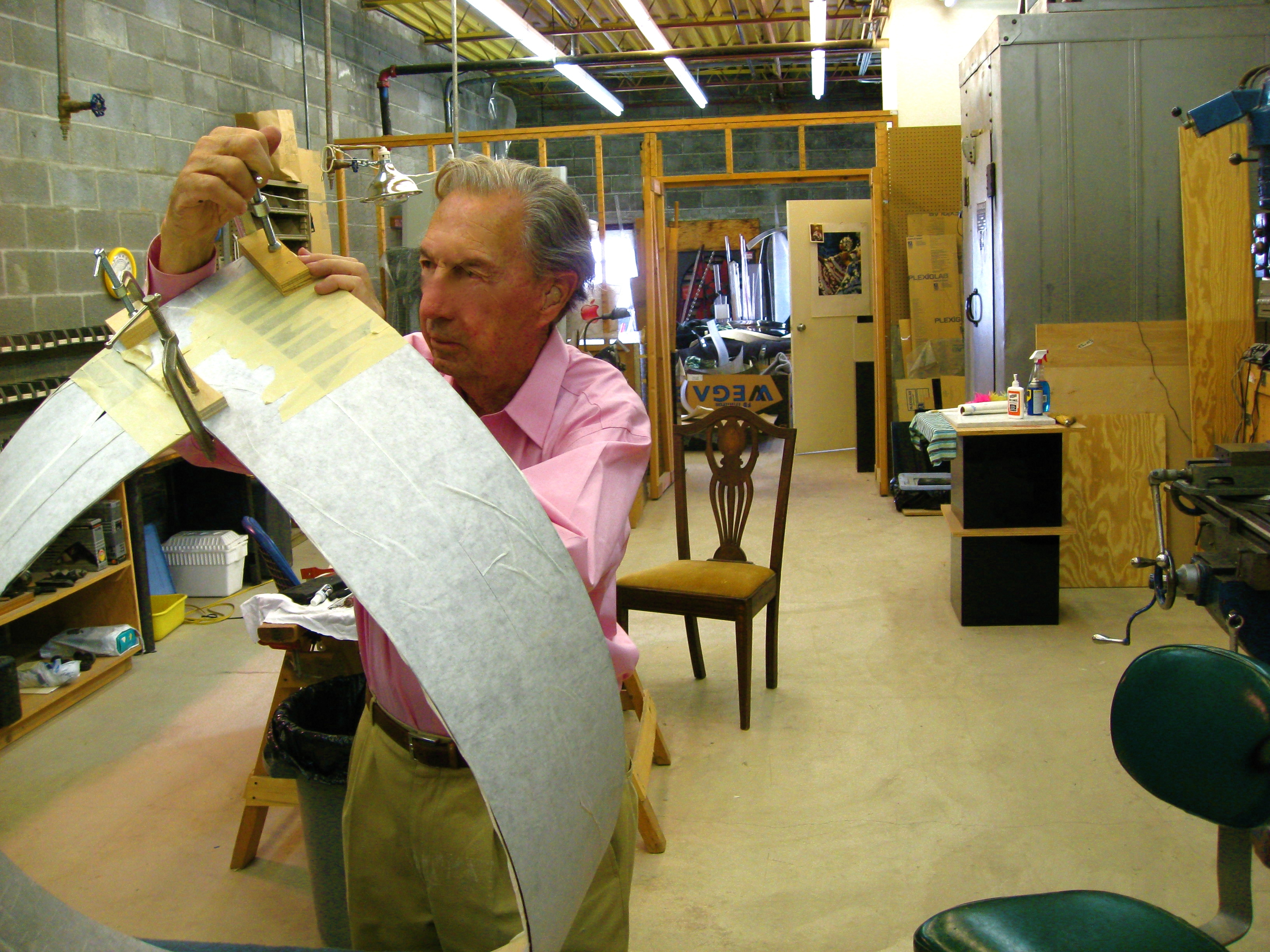
John Safer works on Chandelle

Safer continues to create sculpture. He works with his stepdaughter Kathryn Scott, to whom he taught his trade and offered his mantle. In 2007, they began work on a monumental sculpture, Quest, for the Johns Hopkins Wilmer Eye Institute. The 35-foot-high (11 m) stainless steel fabricated sculpture and state of the art research center, the Robert H. and Clarice Smith Building, was dedicated two years later, on October 16, 2009, 80 years to the day after the pioneering institute's first building made its debut. Safer, a patient, donated the multi-ton sculpture as a gift of appreciation It is one of the largest gifts of art that Johns Hopkins has received. In December 2011, Scott and Safer began work on a model for a monumental sculpture for the Marine Aviation Memorial.

Over the next ten years the Safer-Scott partners continued to collaborate on private and public projects. The eleven foot-high (3.4 m) mirror finished, Interplay, was commissioned for the LEED wing of the $340M Kimmel Cancer Center expansion at Sibley Memorial Hospital in Washington, DC. In 2014 Scott began negotiations with MGM Resorts International for a centerpiece at MGM National Harbor in Maryland. The 60 foot high (18.3 m) stainless steel sculpture, Unity, weighting eighteen thousand pounds and unprecedented in its scale, was installed two years later on November 12, 2016—one month before the opening of the $1.4B resort.

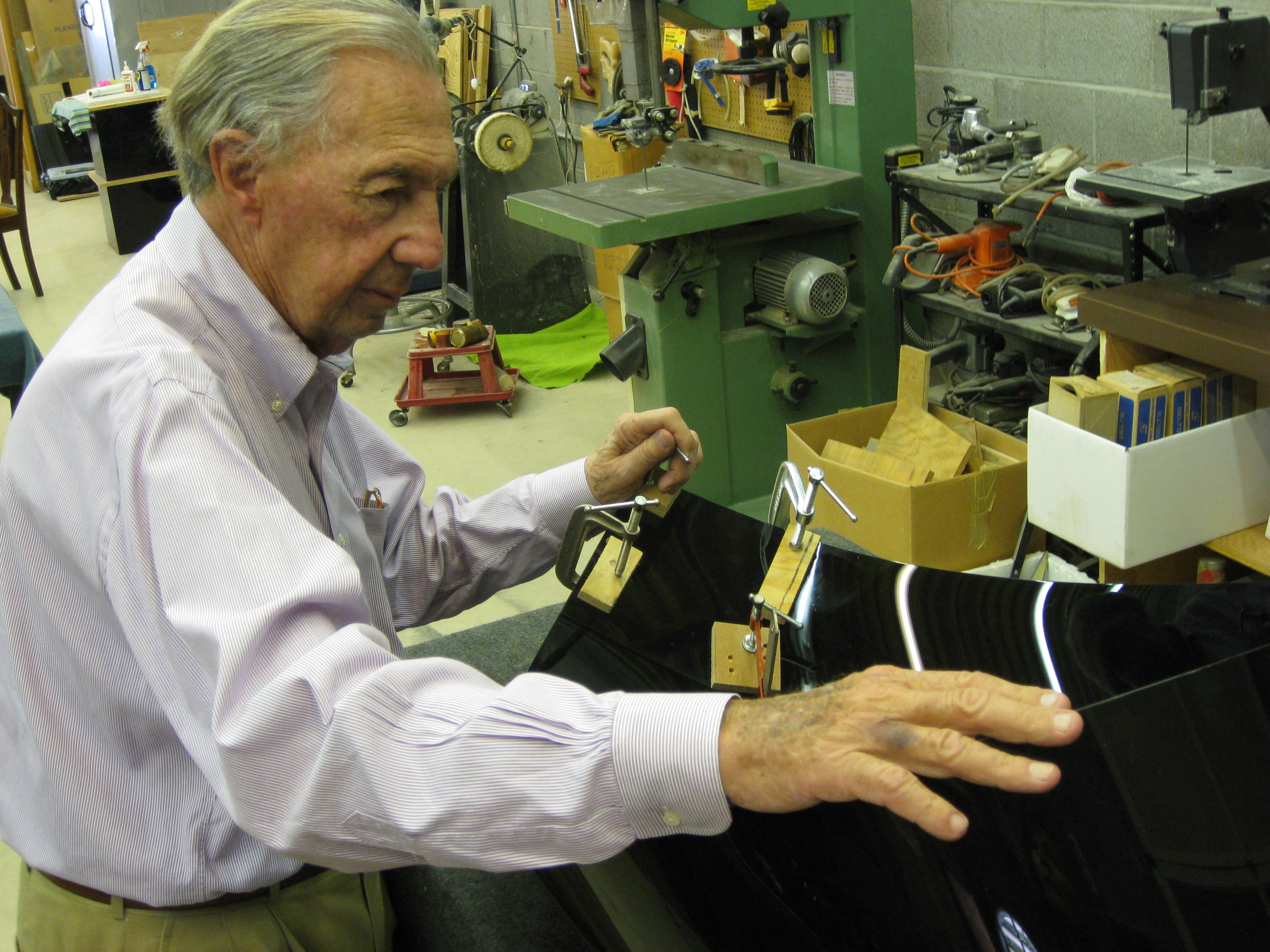
Chandelle receives an inspection

Safer explains the motivation behind his sculpture:

At its best, sculpture can give a glimpse of the relationship between that which lies within us and that which does not. I strive to make works that will elevate the human spirit. What I see and try to capture is the movement of beauty. I try to freeze a line of motion that expresses strength, power, or grace. I try to grasp and make permanent something that is ephemeral.

What I aspire to, as an artist, is contained in the philosophy of the Golden Age of Greece: Truth is beauty; nothing in excess; know thyself. The essential thought behind the creation of my Sculpture is humanity. My goal is to increase the awareness of the beauty of life for myself and for others.

I read once that Mozart could conceptualize a whole symphony in an instantaneous flash. Then he would have the laborious task of committing it to paper. This struck a chord, Mozartian I hope, in me. That's the way I create most of my sculpture. I get a kind of instantaneous flash, a look, a total concept, and then I have to give it substance, make it occupy space.

Safer's interest in sports has provided the inspiration behind many of his sculptures. Dancer and the Dance, Serve, Before the Wind, and Line of Flight are works that capture a line of athletic motion.

Safer credits his wife, Joy, with giving him "a new perspective on the world ... which lifted my sculpture to a level I had not previously attained."

== Civic ==
Smithsonian National Air & Space Museum	Board of Directors
The Scripps Research Institute	Board of Directors
The Shakespeare Guild	Board of Directors
Washington Gallery of Modern Art	Founder and Director
Washington Tennis Center	Founder
Eugene and Agnes Meyer Foundation	Treasurer
U.S. Department of State	Inspector
Eugene McCarthy for President	National Campaign Director

== Bibliography ==
- Guinness Book of World Records, 1990 By Donald McFarlan, Norris Dewar McWhirter, David A. Boeh Contributor David A. Boeh Published by Guinness Superlatives, 1989 ISBN 0-8069-5790-5, ISBN 978-0-8069-5790-6 - Largest Clock called,Timepiece designed by John Safer
- John Safer By Frank Getlein, John Safer Published by J.J. Binns, 1982 Original from the University of Michigan

Digitized Nov 13, 2007 ISBN 0-89674-008-0, ISBN 978-0-89674-008-2

- Art in Flight: The Sculpture of John Safer By Walter J. Boyne, John Safer, David Finn Photographs by David Finn

Contributor David Finn Published by Hudson Hills Press, 1992 Original from the University of Michigan Digitized Nov 13, 2007 ISBN 1-55595-063-9, ISBN 978-1-55595-063-7

- John Safer: [exhibition] April 3–26, 1975, Findlay Galleries. By John Safer, N.Y. David Findlay Galleries New York

Published by The Galleries, 1975

- John Safer. The United States Embassy, 1 Grosvenor Square, London, England. A One Man Exhibition Under the Sponsorship of the Ambassador of the United States of America and Mrs. Walter H. Annenberg, October 6–22, 1971 [and] Valley House Gallery.: The United States Embassy, 1 Grosvenor Square ... By John Safer, Valley House Gallery, United States Embassy Great Britain, Embassy Great Britain, Valley House Gallery, United States Published by Valley House Gallery, 1971
- Refractions By John Safer, Pyramid Galleries, Pyramid Galleries Ltd, Westmoreland County Museum of Art, Westmoreland County Museum of Art Published by Westmoreland County Museum, 1970
