= Bob Balaram =

American NASA electronic engineer (born 1959)

J. “ Bob” Balaram
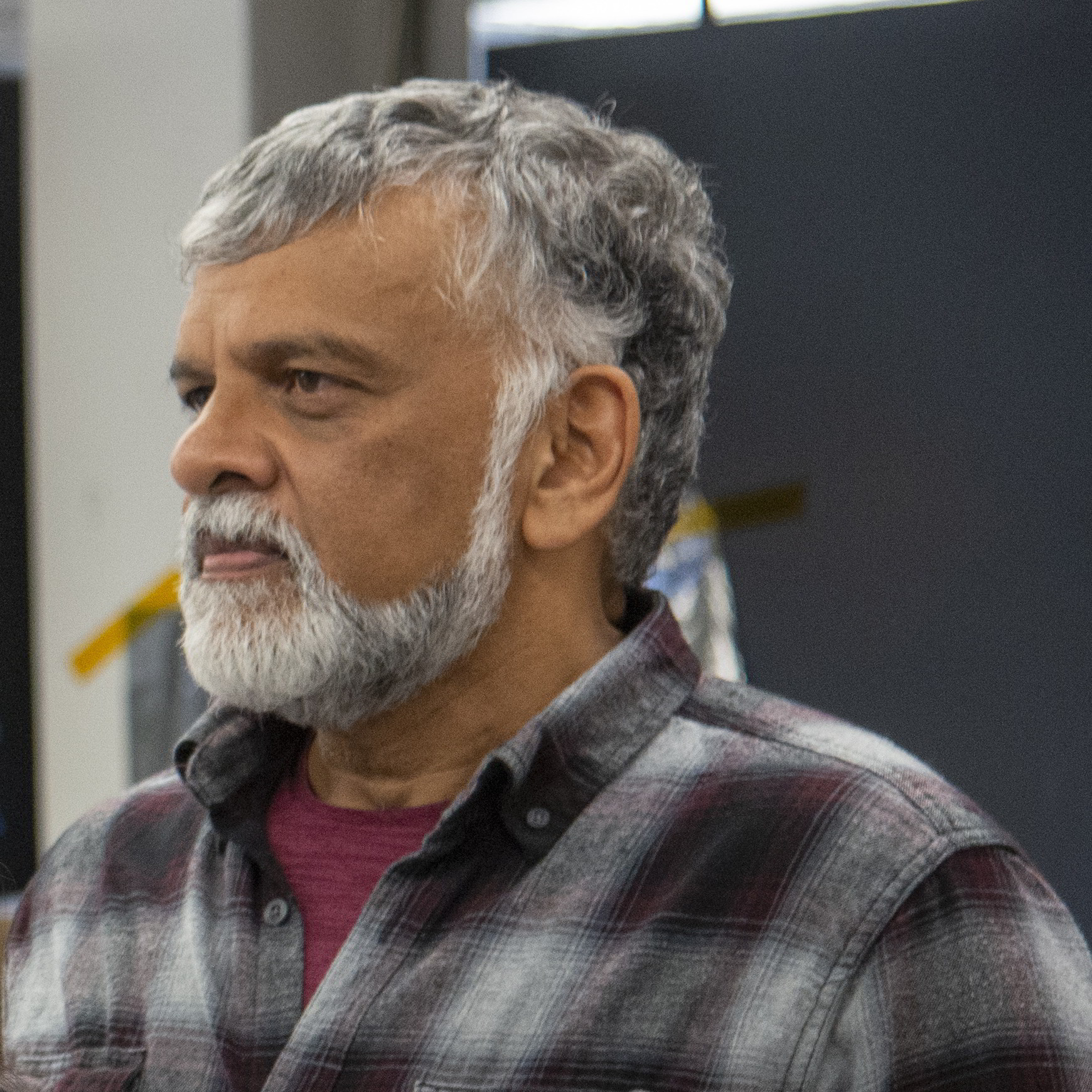
- Born: June 28, 1959 (age 67)
- Education: Indian Institute of Technology, Madras, India, Rensselaer Polytechnic Institute (MS, Ph.D.)
- Known for: Chief Engineer for Ingenuity helicopter, which made the first extraterrestrial powered, controlled flight on April 19, 2021
- Awards: John L. “Jack” Swigert, Jr. Award for Space Exploration from the Space Foundation.
- Scientific career
- Fields: Computer and Systems Engineering, space science
- Institutions: NASA Jet Propulsion Laboratory

J. "Bob" Balaram (born 28 June 1959) is an Indian-American scientist and engineer currently working for National Aeronautics and Space Administration. He is the chief engineer and designer of Ingenuity (project name: Mars 2020 helicopter), the first extraterrestrial aircraft, that was attached underside of car-sized Perseverance rover that successfully landed on the Mars in February 2021.

== Early life and education ==
After schooling at Rishi Valley School, Balaram completed his Bachelor of Technology course from Indian Institute of Technology, Madras, India in 1980, and further went to receive his MS and Ph.D. in Computer and Systems Engineering from Rensselaer Polytechnic Institute, New York.

== Work at NASA ==
Bob joined NASA's JPL in 1985 after finishing his doctorate. He has been working at Jet Propulsion Laboratory for the past 20 years in Mobility & Robotic Systems Department. During his time here, Bob has been actively engaged in the area of telerobotics technology development for several Mars rovers, planetary balloons, descent and landing technology, and surface mobility technology. He is recipient of two NASA awards.

In 2012 MiMi Aung was leading then JPL director Charles Elachi on a tour of JPL's Autonomous Systems Division (ASD). Looking at the drones demonstrating onboard navigation algorithms in one of the labs, Elachi asked, "Hey, why don't we do that on Mars?" ASD engineer Bob Balaram briefed Elachi about feasibility, and a week later Elachi told him, "Okay, I've got some study money for you". By January 2015 NASA agreed to fund the development of a full-size model, which came to be known as the "risk reduction" vehicle.

== Scientific publications ==
- Scott Striepe; J. Balaram; David Way; Alicia Dwyer (2002-06-25). "Mars Smart Lander Simulations for Entry, Descent, and Landing". 5 August 2002 - 08 August 2002 AIAA Atmospheric Flight Mechanics Conference and Exhibit. American Institute of Aeronautics and Astronautics (AIAA). doi:10.2514/6.2002-4412. hdl:2060/20030000914. ISBN 978-1-62410-107-6. S2CID 14905062.
- J. Balaram and P. T. Tokumaru (2014). "Rotorcrafts for Mars Exploration". 11th International Planetary Probe Workshop. 1795: 8087. Bibcode:2014LPICo1795.8087B. Archived from the original on 2021-02-17.
- J. (Bob) Balaram; Timothy Canham; Courtney Duncan; Matt Golombek; Håvard Fjær Grip; Wayne Johnson; Justin Maki; Amelia Quon; Ryan Stern; David Zhu (2018). "Mars Helicopter Technology Demonstrator" (PDF). SciTech Forum Conference 8–12 January 2018 Kissimmee, Florida. American Institute of Aeronautics and Astronautics (AIAA). doi:10.2514/6.2018-0023. ISBN 978-1-62410-525-8.

== Video ==
- Bob Balaram (2021-04-30). NASA's Ingenuity Mars Helicopter's Next Steps (Media Briefing). NASA – via YouTube.

== See also ==
- Swati Mohan

== Status reports of Bob Balaram in the Ingenuity mission ==
- Bob Balaram (March 19, 2021). "How is the Weather on Mars?". Status #287. NASA/JPL.
- Bob Balaram (April 2, 2021). "It's Cold on Mars". Status #288. NASA/JPL.
- Bob Balaram, Jeremy Tyler (May 10, 2021). "Keeping Our Feet Firmly on the Ground". Status #301. NASA/JPL.
- Håvard Grip & Bob Balaram (July 2, 2021). "We're Going Big for Flight 9". Status #313. NASA/JPL.
