= MiMi Aung =

American engineer at Amazon Leo

- မိမိအောင်
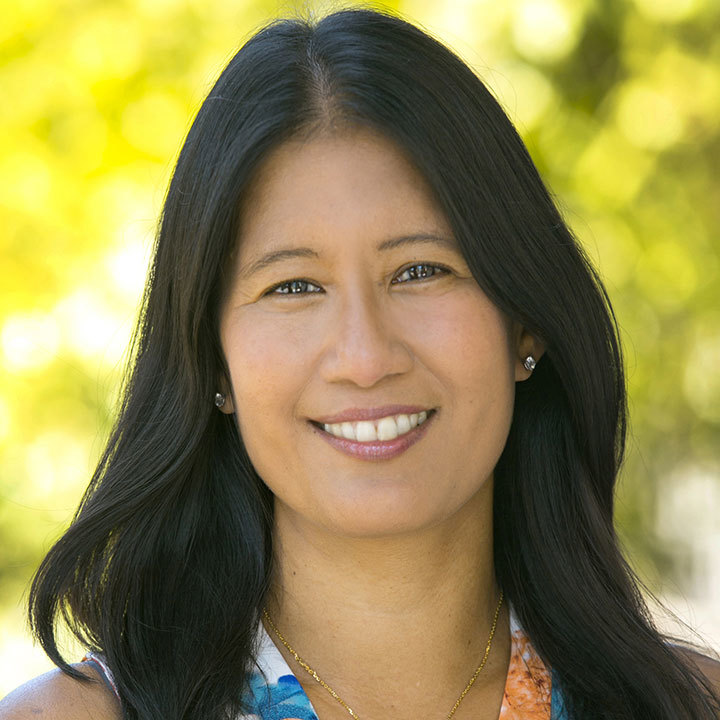
- Born: 1968 (age 57–58); Illinois, USA
- Education: Grainger College of Engineering, University of Illinois at Urbana–Champaign (BSEE, MS)
- Known for: Project lead for Mars Helicopter Ingenuity, which made the first extraterrestrial powered, controlled flight on April 19, 2021
- Children: 2
- Awards: 100 Women, member of the National Academy of Engineering
- Scientific career
- Fields: Electrical engineering, space science
- Workplaces: NASA Jet Propulsion Laboratory, Amazon Kuiper Systems

MiMi Aung (Burmese: မိမိအောင်, Burmese pronunciation: [mḭ mḭ àʊɰ̃]; born 1968) is a Burmese-American engineer. Currently, she is director of technical program management for Amazon Leo, an initiative to increase broadband internet access through an array of satellites in low Earth orbit.

Aung was born in the United States, where her parents met, though her family returned to Burma when she was 2 years old. After spending her childhood in Burma and Malaysia, Aung returned to the United States at age 16 and studied engineering at the University of Illinois at Urbana-Champaign, where she received her Bachelor's and master's degrees.

In 1990, she joined NASA's Jet Propulsion Laboratory (JPL). She was a lead engineer on the Mars Helicopter Ingenuity, the first extraterrestrial aircraft. On February 18, 2021, Ingenuity arrived on Mars, and on April 19 it took its first 39-second flight. Aung said, it “was an incredible moment” and “This morning our dream came true.” The flight was being compared to the first flight in 1903 of the Wright brothers' airplane, a small piece of which was carried by the helicopter to Mars.

== Early life and family ==
MiMi Aung's parents met in the United States when they were studying for their doctorates. Her mother, Hla Hla Sein, was the first woman from Myanmar to earn a doctoral degree in mathematics. Her father, Thein Aung, received his doctorate in chemistry.

Aung was born in Illinois and returned to Myanmar with her parents when she was two and a half years old. When she was 11, the family moved to Malaysia, where she attended St. Christopher's School. At the age of 16, her parents arranged for her to return to the U.S. and stay with some friends in Illinois while she finished her education. Her two younger sisters were not born in the U.S. and so could not emigrate there.

Aung is married and has two children.

== Education ==
Interested in mathematics at a young age, Aung studied electrical engineering at the University of Illinois at Urbana–Champaign, where she earned her bachelor's degree, followed by a master's degree in 1990 with a focus on communications and signal processing. During her master's program, she was introduced to JPL's work in deep space exploration and its relationship to signal processing after a conversation with one of her professors.

== Research and career ==
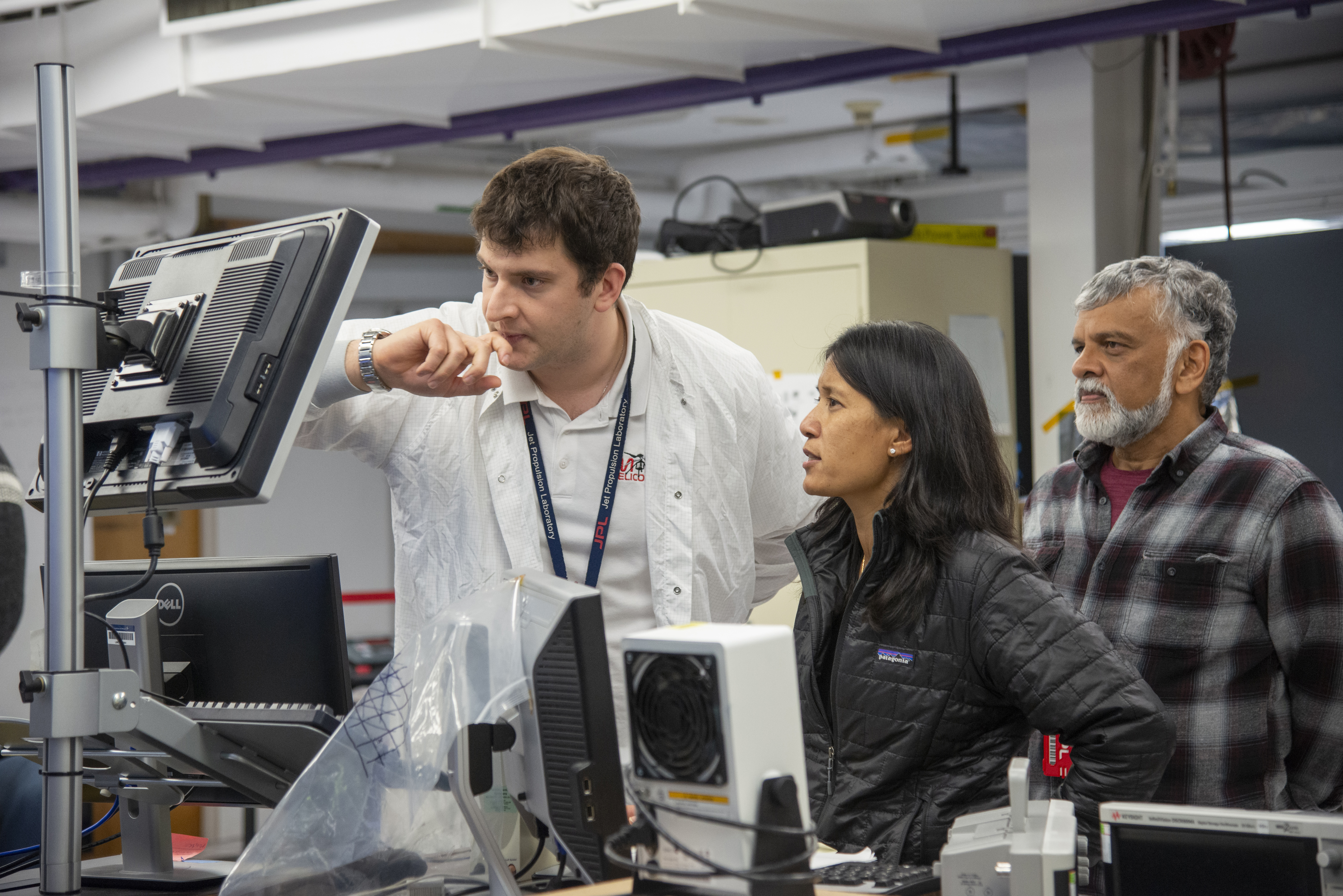
Teddy Tzanetos, MiMi Aung and Bob Balaram monitoring a helicopter flight

=== NASA Jet Propulsion Laboratory (JPL) ===
In 1990, Aung joined JPL, where she worked on various projects related to spaceflight and the NASA Deep Space Network (DSN).

==== Deep Space Network (DSN) ====
Aung started her career working in the Radio Frequency and Microwave Subsystems Section of the DSN, where she developed and tested algorithms for the Block V Receiver. She deployed the digital receiver at each of the world's three DSN complexes, before working on monopulse radar systems. These systems were used in combination with the 34-meter antennas for the DSN. She worked on the 240-GHz radiometer for the Earth Orbiting System Microwave Limb Sounder.

Aung's next project involved the StarLight two-spacecraft interferometer, for which she designed the autonomous formation radio frequency flying sensor. She was selected as the project element manager of the Terrestrial Planet Finder (TPF)'s formation flying program., but after funding for the TPF was indefinitely delayed in 2006, the project was postponed and was eventually formally canceled in 2011.

In 2003, Aung was made technical group supervisor of the Guidance, Navigation, and Control Sensors Group. In this capacity she created sensor technologies for spaceflight missions. She became increasingly interested in autonomous space exploration and was made manager of the section in 2010. She was also a member of the Psyche spacecraft project team. In 2013 she became Deputy Manager of the Autonomous Systems Division.

==== Mars helicopter project ====
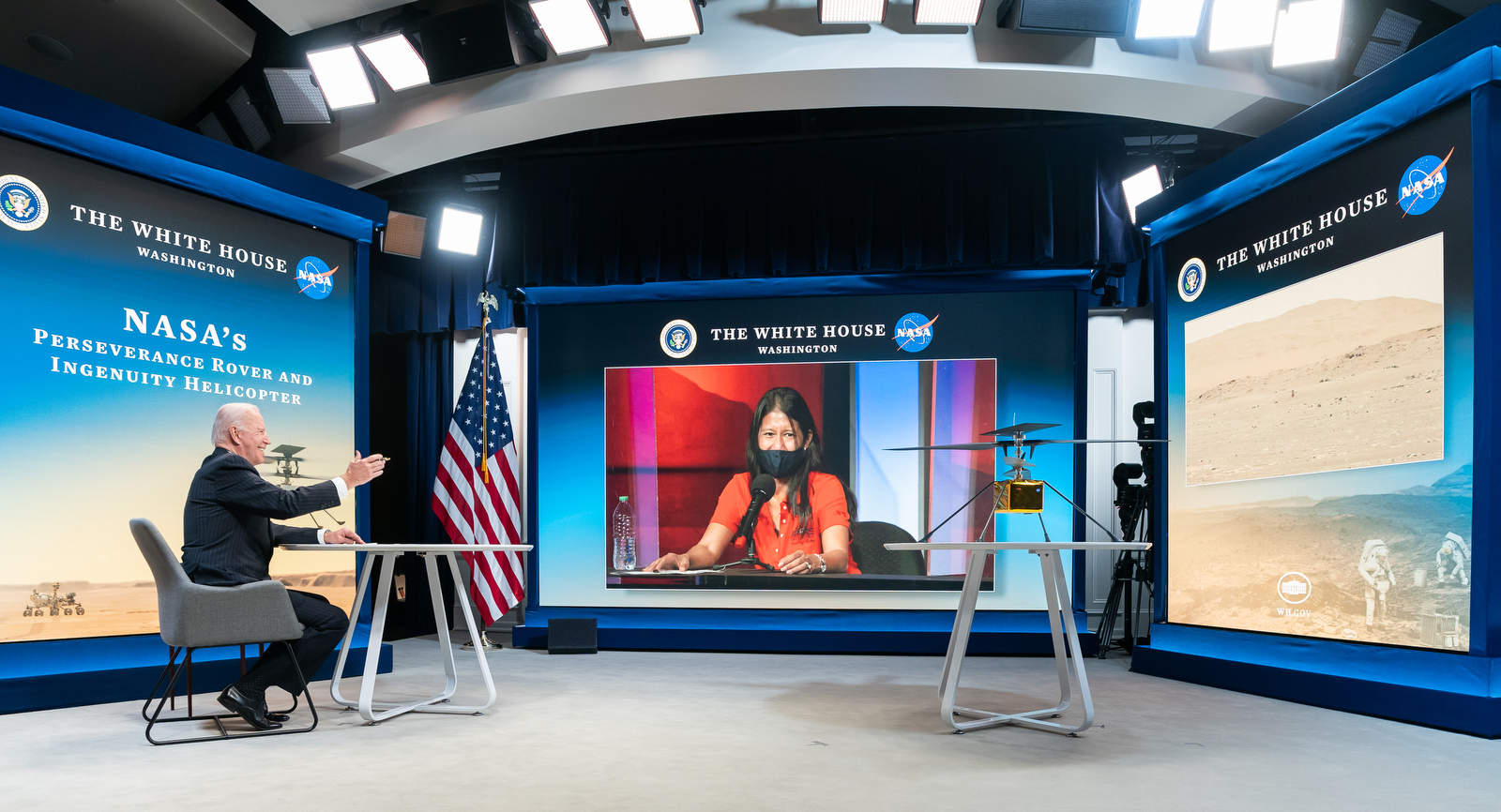
President Biden is briefed by MiMi Aung after the first flight of NASA's Ingenuity helicopter on Mars on Monday, April 19, 2021

Since 2015, Aung has been the lead for Mars helicopter technology demonstration development and oversees the diverse team that designed, built, tested and flew Ingenuity. Other team members include chief engineer Bob Balaram, originally from India, and chief pilot Håvard Grip, originally from Norway.

The atmosphere on Mars is only 1% of the atmospheric density on Earth, so a key question was how to generate enough lift for flight. The helicopter had to be very light-weight, and its blades had to be able to spin much faster than they would need to do on Earth. In addition, the helicopter could not be controlled by someone on Earth because radio signals take too long to get to Mars. As a result, engineers at JPL equipped Ingenuity with a computerized system that allows it to stabilize itself and navigate on its own.

The first flight tests of the Mars Helicopter took place within the JPL space simulator in early 2019. The total cost of the helicopter was around $23 million, with a weight less than 1.8 kg. The helicopter was attached to the belly of the Perseverance rover and launched from Cape Canaveral in Florida on July 30, 2020, as part of NASA's Mars 2020 mission. The rover successfully landed in Jezero Crater on Mars on February 18, 2021, and two days later, JPL received its first status report from Ingenuity via the Mars Reconnaissance Orbiter. The helicopter was successfully deployed on April 3, 2021.

==== Ingenuity Mars flights ====
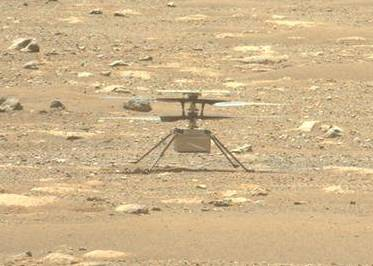
Perseverance's NavCams Views Ingenuity During its Third Flight

On April 19, 2021, Ingenuity made the first powered, controlled flight by an aircraft on another planet. The team at JPL confirmed the flight succeeded after receiving data from the helicopter via the rover at 6:46 a.m. EDT (3:46 a.m. PDT).

The helicopter completed its technology demonstration after three successful flights. For the first flight, Ingenuity took off, climbed to about 10 feet (3.0 meters) above the ground, hovered in the air briefly, completed a turn, and then landed. After that, the helicopter successfully performed additional experimental flights of incrementally farther distance and greater altitude. Ingenuity had been operating on Mars for 1042 sols (1071 total days; 1 year, 341 days) before retirement, when all four of its rotor blades was damaged, causing NASA to retire the craft.

=== Amazon Kuiper Systems ===
In July 2021, after 30 years at JPL, Aung left for a new role as director of technical program management at Amazon's Kuiper Systems. This project is an initiative to improve broadband internet access to communities around the world using a network of satellites in low Earth orbit.

== Awards and public engagement ==
For her accomplishments, Aung has been:

- Selected as one of the top 100 Women in the world by the BBC in 2019.
- Named one of TIME Magazine’s 100 Most Influential People of 2021
- Inducted in 2022 as a member of the National Academy of Engineering (NAE), America’s leading engineering organization, which advises the federal government on matters related to science and technology. All members are elected by their peers. Aung was recognized for her pioneering work on the NASA Mars Helicopter and the first flight on another planet.
- Honored with the 2022 Distinguished Alumni Award from the University of Illinois for her "technical contributions and innovation in spacecraft, autonomy in space and for leadership on the NASA helicopter Ingenuity."
- Awarded in 2025 the Prix international d’astronautique by the Société astronomique de France.

Aung is an expert for The Planetary Society and has written for Spaceflight.

During the development of the helicopter, Aung installed a webcam in the cleanroom at JPL that allowed the public to watch the team's progress.

Aung was featured in the 2019 documentary Space Queens, along with several other women who were inspired by Apollo 11. The archival footage mentioned her involvement in the Mars 2020 project and, in particular, her work on the Ingenuity helicopter.

On 24 April 2023, Aung spoke at the Radcliffe Institute for Advanced Study at Harvard University. Her lecture "The Sky’s Not the Limit: My Journey into Space Exploration and STEM," described her personal journey as a space engineer.

Aung is currently a member of the University of Illinois Electrical & Computer Engineering Alumni Board.
