= WISDOM (radar) =

- Operator: European Space Agency
- Instrument type: Ground-penetrating radar
- Function: Geophysical imaging
- Mission duration: ≥ 7 months
- Website: ExoMars Rover Instrument Suite

Host spacecraft
- Spacecraft: Rosalind Franklin rover
- Operator: ESA
- Launch date: NET 2028

WISDOM (Water Ice and Subsurface Deposit Observation on Mars) is a ground-penetrating radar that is part of the science payload on board the European Space Agency's Rosalind Franklin rover, tasked to search for biosignatures and biomarkers on Mars. The rover is planned to be launched not earlier than 2028 and land on Mars in 2029.

== Background ==
The search for evidence of past or present life on Mars is the principal objective of the ExoMars programme. If such evidence exists, it will most likely be in the subsurface, where organic molecules are shielded from the destructive effects of ionizing radiation and atmospheric oxidants. For this reason, the Rosalind Franklin rover mission has been optimized to investigate the subsurface and sample those locations where conditions for the preservation of evidence of past life are most likely to be found.

== Overview ==
WISDOM	Parameter/units
Center frequency	1.75 GHz
Frequency bandwidth	2.5 GHz
Wavelength in vacuum	0.1–0.6 m
Frequency step	2.5 MHz
Step duration	200 μs
Receiving channel adjustable gain	−7 to 25 dB
Antenna gain	1 to 8 dB
IFT gain	27 db

WISDOM is a step frequency radar that operates in the frequency range from 0.5 to 3 GHz. It will provide high-resolution 3D imaging down to a depth of 3 metres. WISDOM will use UHF radar pulses to provide the three-dimensional geological context of the shallow subsurface underneath the ExoMars rover. It will be used to identify optimal drilling sites and to ensure the safety of the core drill, as well as investigate the local distribution and state of subsurface water ice and brine.

It can transmit and receive signals using two, small Vivaldi-antennas mounted on the aft section of the rover. Electromagnetic waves penetrating into the ground are reflected at places where there is a sudden transition in the electrical parameters of the soil. By studying these reflections it is possible to construct a stratigraphic map of the subsurface and identify underground targets down to 2 to 3 m (7 to 10 ft) in depth, comparable to the 2 m reach of the rover's drill. These data, combined with those produced by the PanCam and by the analyses carried out on previously collected samples, will be used to support drilling activities.

Field tests with a remote-controlled rover, show that WISDOM can be operated continuously while the rover is in motion at a reduced speed of approximately 20 m/h. All WISDOM data will be relayed to Earth via ExoMars Trace Gas Orbiter, and processing will be performed on Earth.

The WISDOM team consists of scientists from France, Germany, Italy, Norway, Austria, United Kingdom and the United States. The Principal Investigator is Valérie Ciarletti, from LATMOS, France. The Co-Principal Investigator is Svein-Erik Hamran from Norway.

== See also ==
- Astrobiology
- Life on Mars
- Water on Mars
