= Timeline of Mars 2020 =

Event timeline of the NASA Mars 2020 mission

Self-portrait of Mars 2020 containing Perseverance rover and Ingenuity helicopter located at the Ingenuity helicopter drop site (7 April 2021)

The Mars 2020 mission, consisting of the rover Perseverance and helicopter Ingenuity, was launched on July 30, 2020, and landed in Jezero crater on Mars on February 18, 2021. As of September 2, 2026, Perseverance has been on the planet for 1968 sols (2022 total days; 5 years, 196 days). Ingenuity operated for 1042 sols (1071 total days; 1 year, 341 days) until its rotor blades, possibly all four, were damaged during the landing of flight 72 on January 18, 2024, causing NASA to retire the craft.

Current weather data on Mars is being monitored by the Curiosity rover and had previously been monitored by the Insight lander. The Perseverance rover is also collecting weather data. (See the External links section)

== Mission overview ==
=== Prelaunch (2012–2020) ===
The Mars 2020 mission was announced by NASA on December 4, 2012. In 2017 the three sites (Jezero crater, Northeastern Syrtis Major Planum, and Columbia Hills) were chosen as potential landing locations, with Jezero crater selected as the landing location, and launched on July 30th, 2020, from Cape Canaveral.

=== Landing and initial tests (February–May 2021) ===
After arriving on February 18, Perseverance focused on validating its systems. During this phase, it used its science instruments for the first time, generated oxygen on Mars with MOXIE, and deployed Ingenuity. Ingenuity began the technology demonstration phase of its mission, completing five flights before transitioning to the operations demonstration phase of its mission.

=== Cratered floor campaign (June 2021-April 2022) ===
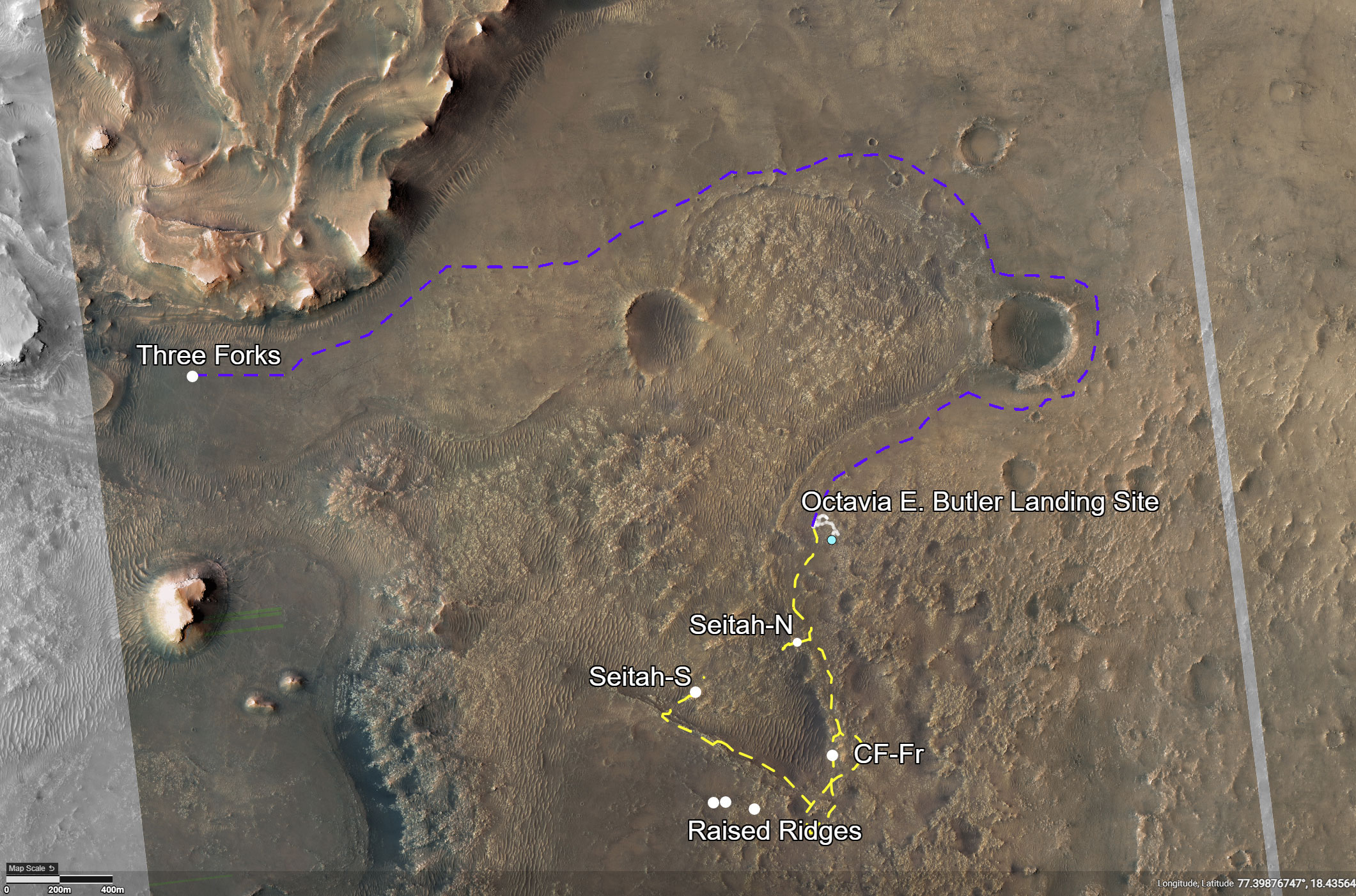
Perseverance rover - map of the first science campaign (yellow lines, below the landing site). The blue lines above the landing site correspond to the planned second campaign, although the second campaign did not officially start until the arrival of the rover at Three Forks.

The Cratered Floor Campaign was the first science campaign. It began on June 1, 2021, with the goal of exploring the Crater Floor Fractured Rough and Séítah geologic units. To avoid the sand dunes of the Séítah unit, Perseverance mostly traveled within the Crater Floor Fractured Rough geologic unit or along the boundary between the two units. The first nine of Perseverance's sample tubes were to be filled during this expedition, including the first three 'witness tubes'.

After collecting the samples, Perseverance returned to its landing site, before continuing to the delta for its second science campaign. Some of the sample tubes filled during this campaign were later stored in a designated area for the upcoming NASA-ESA Mars Sample Return mission, during the Delta Front Campaign. While Perseverance embarked on its first science campaign, Ingenuity continued to travel alongside the rover as part of its operations demonstration campaign. Ingenuity's sixth through twenty-fifth flights were completed during this phase, achieving an at-the-time speed record of 5.5 meters per second.

=== Delta front campaign (April 2022 - January 2023) ===
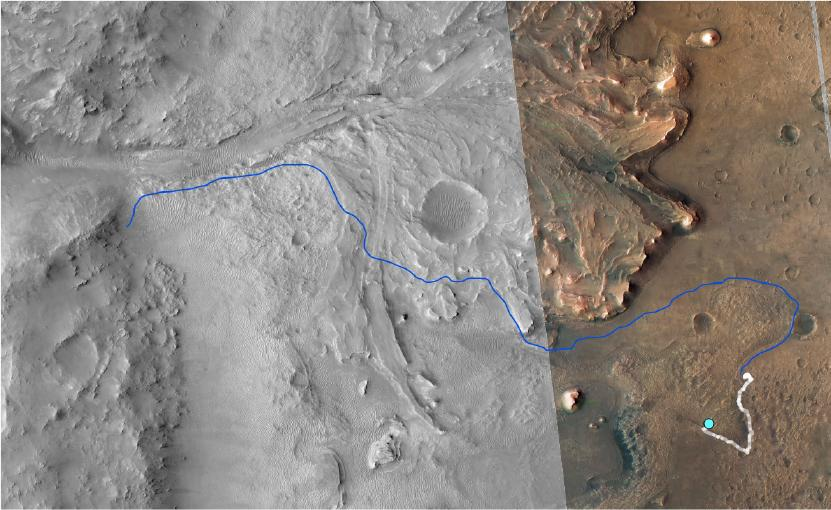
In blue, the planned traverse of Perseverance. The second science campaign began just before the background map transitions to black and white.

The Delta Front Campaign was the second science campaign of the Mars 2020 mission. The campaign began with Ingenuity continuing to travel alongside the rover as part of its operations demonstration campaign, and Perseverance leaving the rapid traverse mode it had entered at the end of the last mission to rapidly reach the delta. During the campaign, Perseverance would take a further nine samples, in addition to two further witness tubes. Ingenuity would make its 41th flight during this mission. An incident occurred in which Ingenuity was unable to sufficiently charge during the night, leading to a change in how Ingenuity manages its heaters. The MOXIE experiment continued to run, generating a record amount of oxygen-per-hour on Mars. The campaign concluded with Perseverance reaching the top of the delta and the completion of its first sample depot.

=== Upper fan campaign (January 2023 - September 2023) ===
The Upper Fan Campaign, also called the Delta Top Campaign, was the third science campaign of the Mars 2020 mission. Whereas prior campaigns investigated areas that are believed to have been submerged in an ancient lake, this campaign investigated one of the riverbeds that used to feed into the lake. The MOXIE experiment completed its 16th, and final, oxygen generation test during this campaign. Ingenuity completed its 54th flight during this campaign. The helicopter experienced an anomaly that caused it to land outside the range of the rover, but this was ultimately resolved when the rover moved into a position that allowed contact to be restored. The campaign ended with Perseverance reaching the margin carbonate geologic unit, after having taken three further rock samples (and 21 overall).

=== Margin campaign (September 2023 - August 2024) ===
The Margin Campaign was the fourth of the Mars 2020 mission. The campaign was expected to last around 8 months, although it lasted closer to a year, after which point Perseverance began the Crater Rim Campaign. The campaign gets its name from the geological unit it aims to explore - the margin carbonate unit. Rocks in this unit are capable of containing traces of life, and their formation is tied to the presence of liquid water.

During the campaign, Ingenuity achieved several records, including a max altitude of 24 meters (flight 61) and a maximum groundspeed of 10 meters per second (flight 62). Unfortunately, due to a failure on the 72nd flight, the helicopter blades became too damaged to fly. On January 25th, 2024, NASA declared the end of Ingenuity's mission - the helicopter's final resting place was named Valinor Hills, after a location in the Lord of the Rings franchise. Despite the loss of Ingenuity's blades, the core of the helicopter remained intact; it will continue to monitor atmospheric conditions for as long as it is able. Perseverance took four further rock samples during this campaign (25 overall). The campaign overlapped with solar conjunction, interfering with the ability to communicate with the rover from Earth.

Engineers from NASA’s Jet Propulsion Laboratory in Southern California and AeroVironment are completing a detailed assessment of the Ingenuity Mars Helicopter’s final flight on January 18, 2024, the first of its kind on an extraterrestrial planet, concluding that the inability of Ingenuity’s navigation system to provide accurate data during the flight likely caused a chain of events that ended the mission.

The helicopter’s vision navigation system was designed to track visual features on the surface using a downward-looking camera over well-textured (pebbly) but flat terrain. This limited tracking capability was more than sufficient for carrying out Ingenuity’s first five flights, but by Flight 72 the helicopter was in a region of Jezero Crater filled with steep, relatively featureless sand ripples.

One of the navigation system’s main requirements was to provide velocity estimates that would enable the helicopter to land within a small envelope of vertical and horizontal velocities. Data sent down during Flight 72 shows that, around 20 seconds after takeoff, the navigation system couldn’t find enough surface features to track.

Photographs taken after the flight indicate the navigation errors created high horizontal velocities at touchdown. In the most likely scenario, the hard impact on the sand ripple’s slope caused Ingenuity to pitch and roll. The rapid attitude change resulted in loads on the fast-rotating rotor blades beyond their design limits, snapping all four of them off at their weakest point — about a third of the way from the tip. The damaged blades caused excessive vibration in the rotor system, ripping the remainder of one blade from its root and generating an excessive power demand that resulted in loss of communications.

=== Northern rim campaign (August 2024 - present) ===
The Northern Rim Campaign is the fifth, currently ongoing science campaign, and the first new science campaign since the loss of the Ingenuity helicopter. It was originally called the Crater Rim Campaign. It has included a total elevation change of over 1000 feet (~300 meters). The main focuses of the campaign are expected to be at the regions "Pico Turquino" and "Witch Hazel Hill". It is expected to encounter rocks as old as 4 billion years.

Due to the steepness and slipperiness of terrain encountered during the campaign, Perseverance has not been able to travel as fast as expected. Despite this, it has still traveled faster than the only remaining other active Mars rover, Curiosity. Various strategies were tried to mitigate the issue. Furthermore, the rover's supply of sample tubes has begun to run out, with only 10 of the original 43 sample tubes remaining unused as of August 2025. Two of those tubes have been retired because of worries that the process of using them may cause components of the rover to catch on each other in a dangerous way. Despite these setbacks, Perseverance has performed well; it set a Mars record with a single-day drive of 412 meters, and an engineering review determined that the rover could last until at least 2031 and that its wheels would remain at optimal performance for at least 37 miles.

In December 2024, the rover reached the top of the crater rim. After reaching the top, Perseverance collected its oldest rock sample yet in January and reached Witch Hazel Hill, one of the main focuses of the campaign, which it left in May 2025. As of December 2025, it was on its way to a region called 'Lac de Charmes', a plain just beyond the crater rim. A Mars solar conjunction lasted from December 29th, 2025 to January 16, 2026, during which time contact with the rover was inhibited.

On December 8th and 10th, 2025 (Sols 1707 and 1709), Perseverance executed a drive whose waypoints were fully planned by generative AI. While the plan was first validated by the engineering team before being sent to the rover, it marks the first use of generative AI to fully plan a drive. The drive was completed successfully, moving 210 meters on the first day and 246 meters on the second. The rover's visual odometry also received an upgrade, allowing it to better pinpoint its location autonomously and further improving the distance Perseverance could reliably travel without human assistance.

== Timeline of samples cached ==
In support of the NASA-ESA Mars Sample Return, rock, regolith (Martian soil), and atmosphere samples are being cached by Perseverance. As of July 2025, 33 out of 43 sample tubes have been filled, including 8 igneous rock samples, 13 sedimentary rock sample tubes, 3 Igneous/Impactite rock sample tubes, a Serpentinite rock sample tube, a Silica-cemented carbonate rock sample tube, two regolith sample tubes, an atmosphere sample tube, and three witness tubes. Before launch, 5 of the 43 tubes were designated "witness tubes" and filled with materials that would capture particulates in the ambient environment of Mars. Out of 43 tubes, 3 witness sample tubes will not be returned to Earth and will remain on rover as the sample canister will only have 30 tube slots. Further, 10 of the 43 tubes are left as backups at the Three Forks Sample Depot.

However, after a project review critical of its cost and complexity, NASA announced that the Mars Sample Return project was "paused" as of November 13, 2023. In April 2024, in a NASA update via teleconference, the NASA Administrator emphasized continuing the commitment to retrieving the samples. However, the $11 billion cost was deemed infeasible. NASA turned to industry and the Jet Propulsion Laboratory (JPL) to form a new, more fiscally feasible mission profile to retrieve the samples.

Mars sample-return mission - Sampling Process

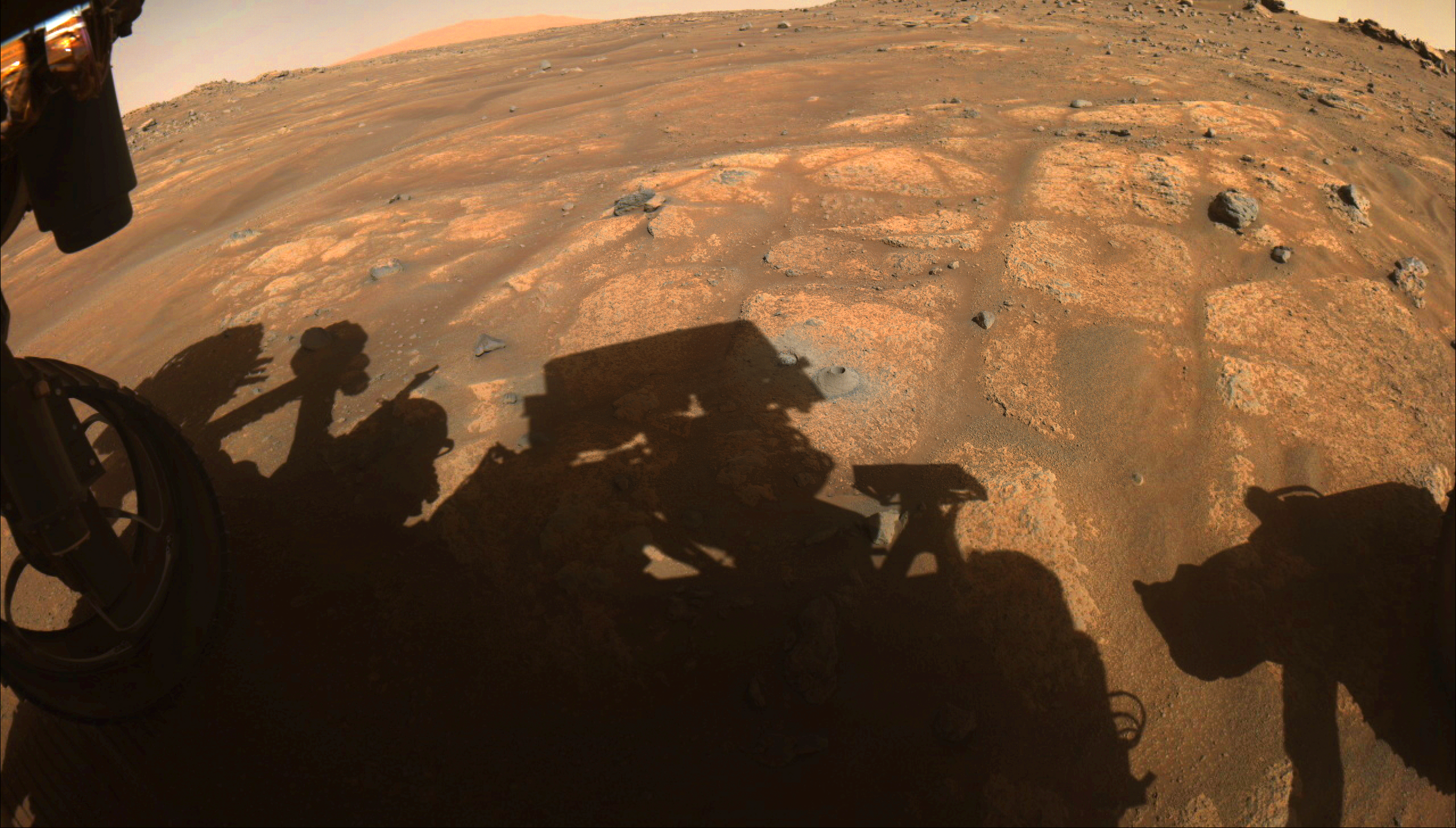
Context

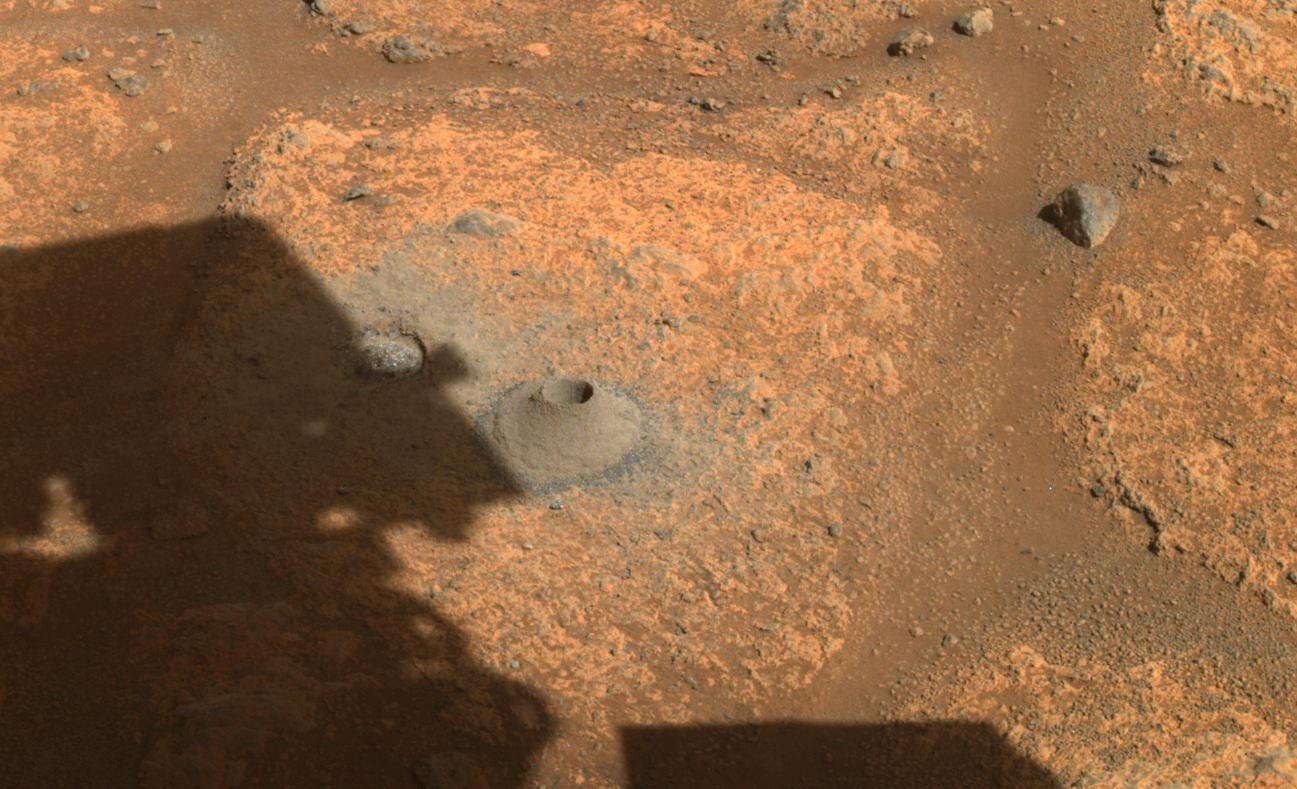
MidView

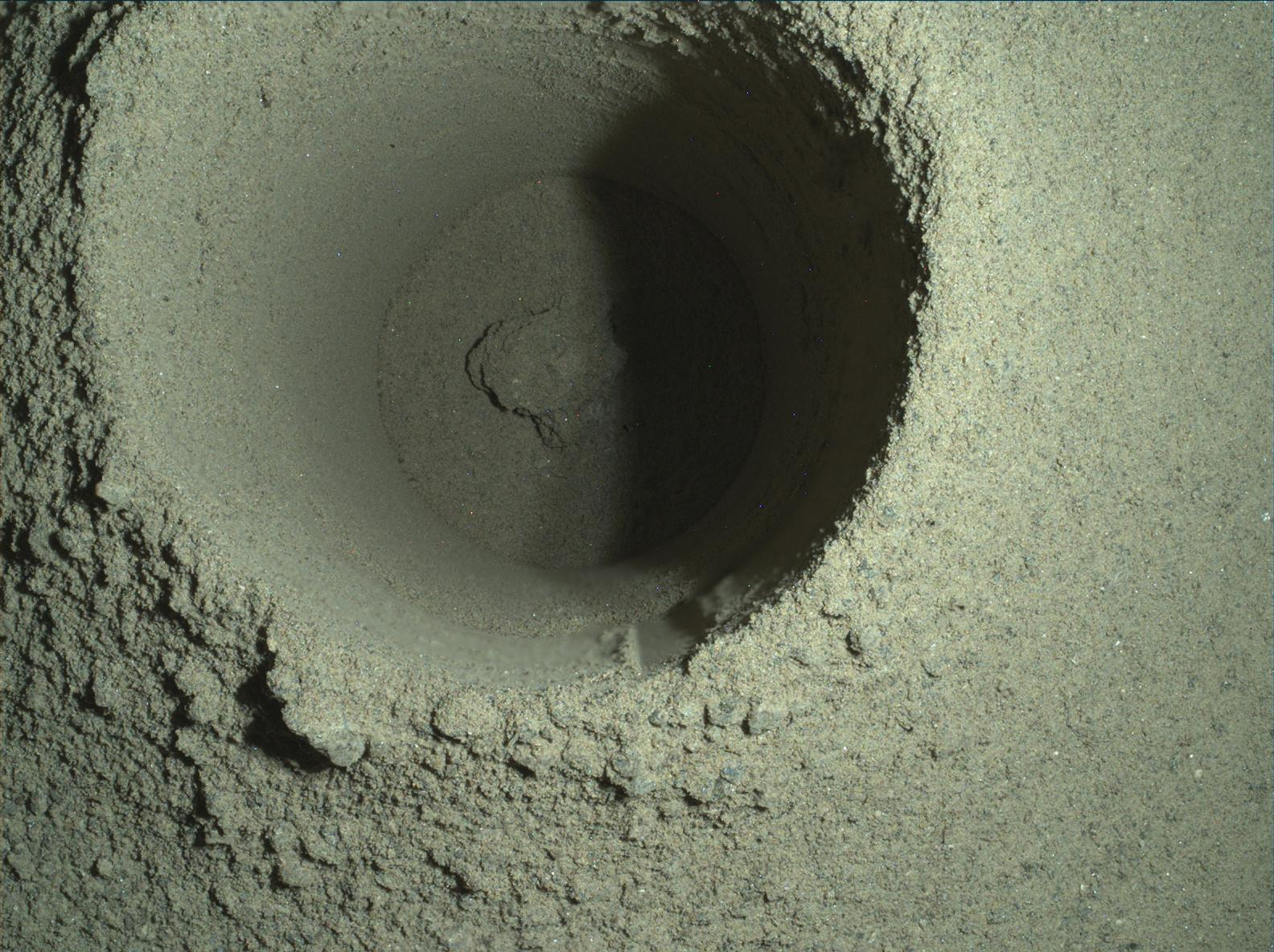
CloseUp

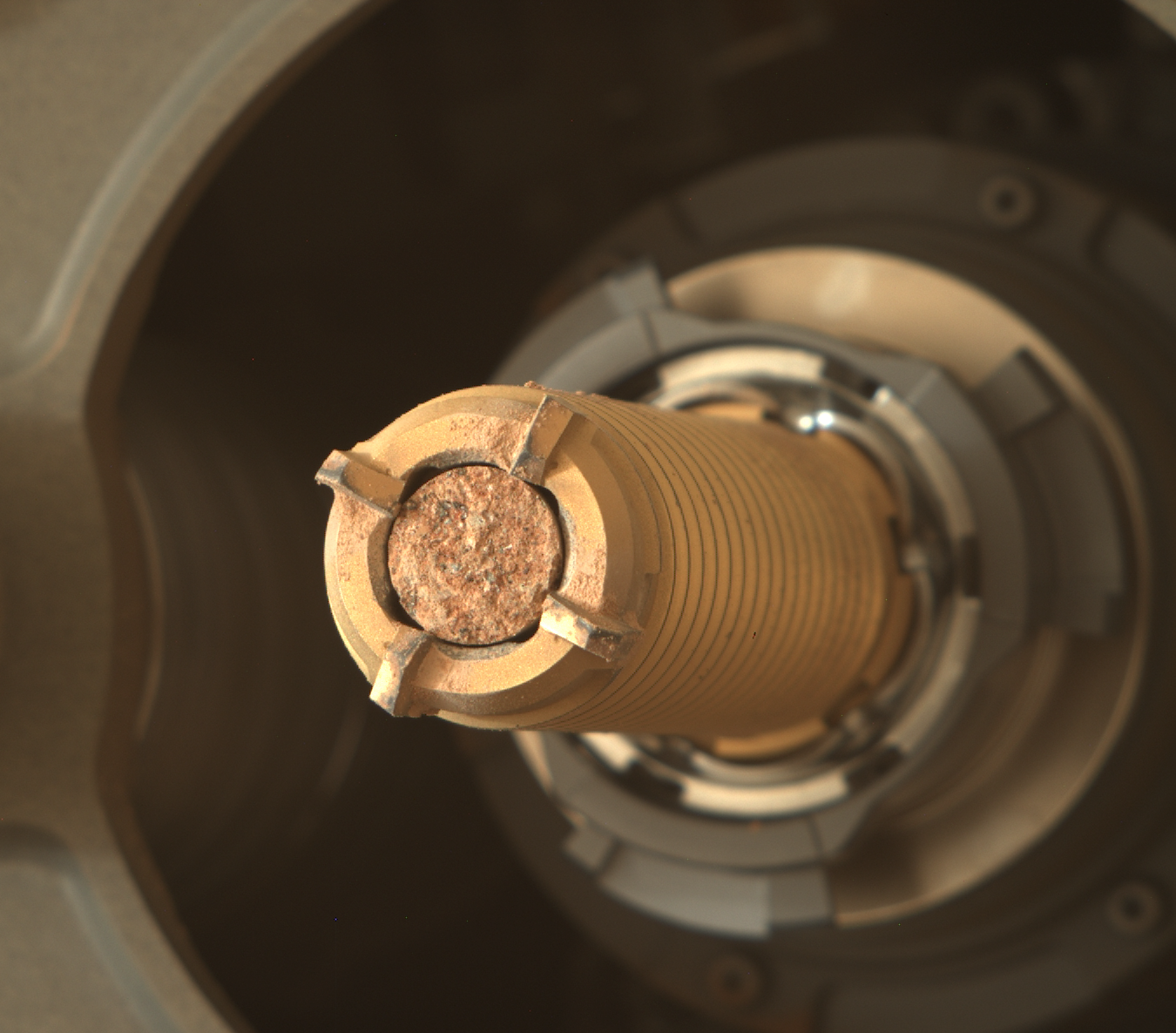
Sample in drill

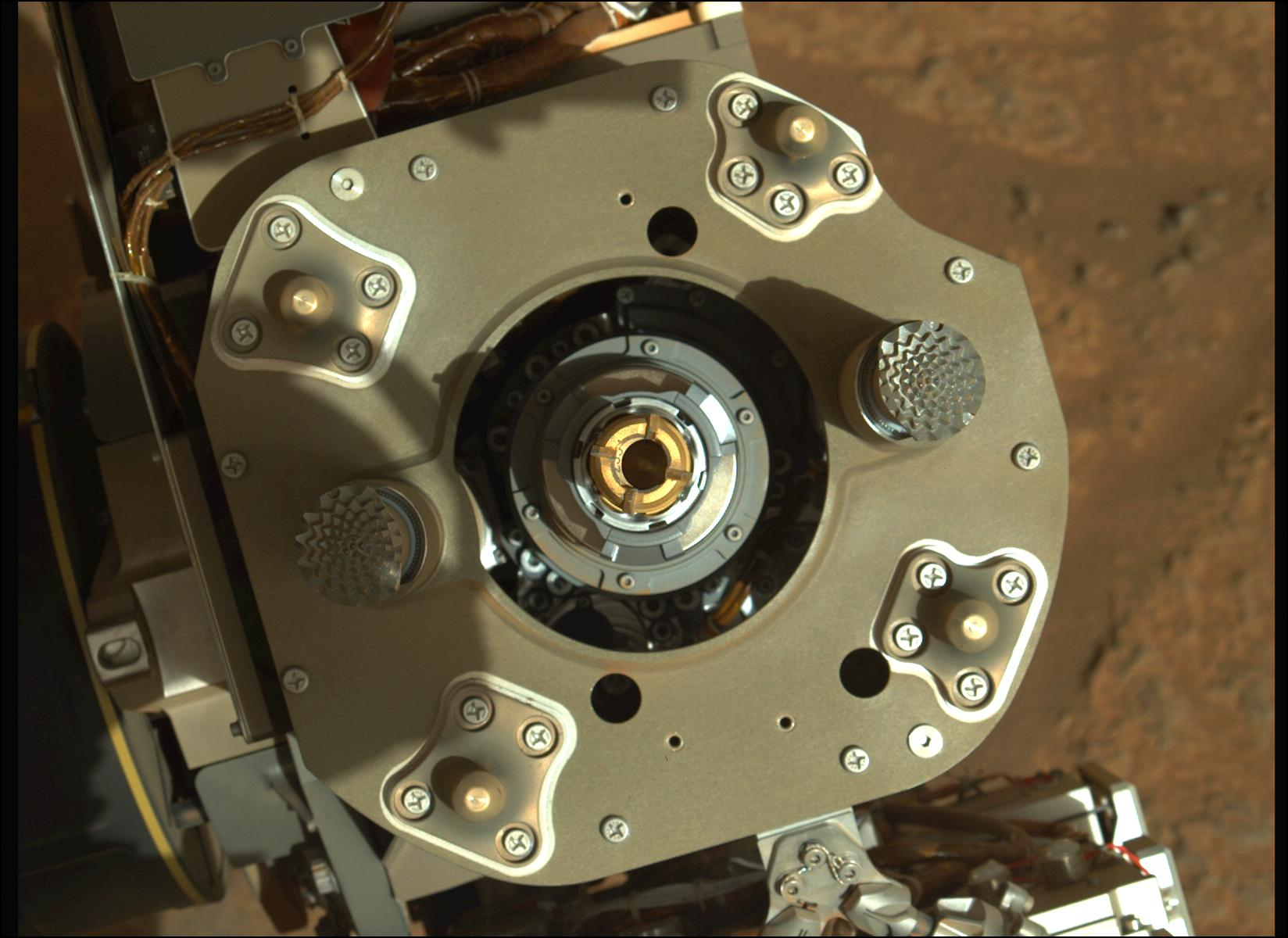
Sampling drill

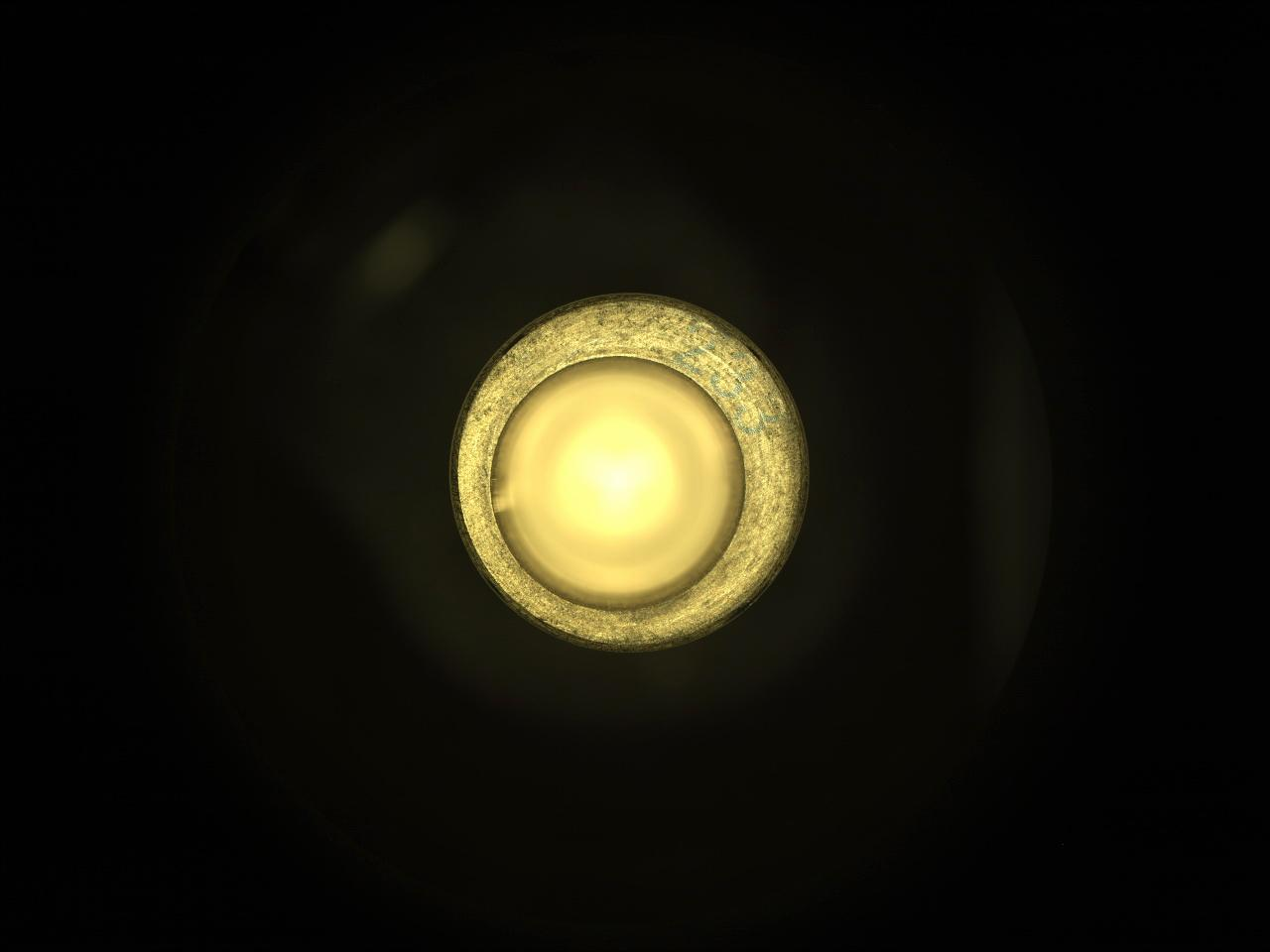
Sample Tube 233

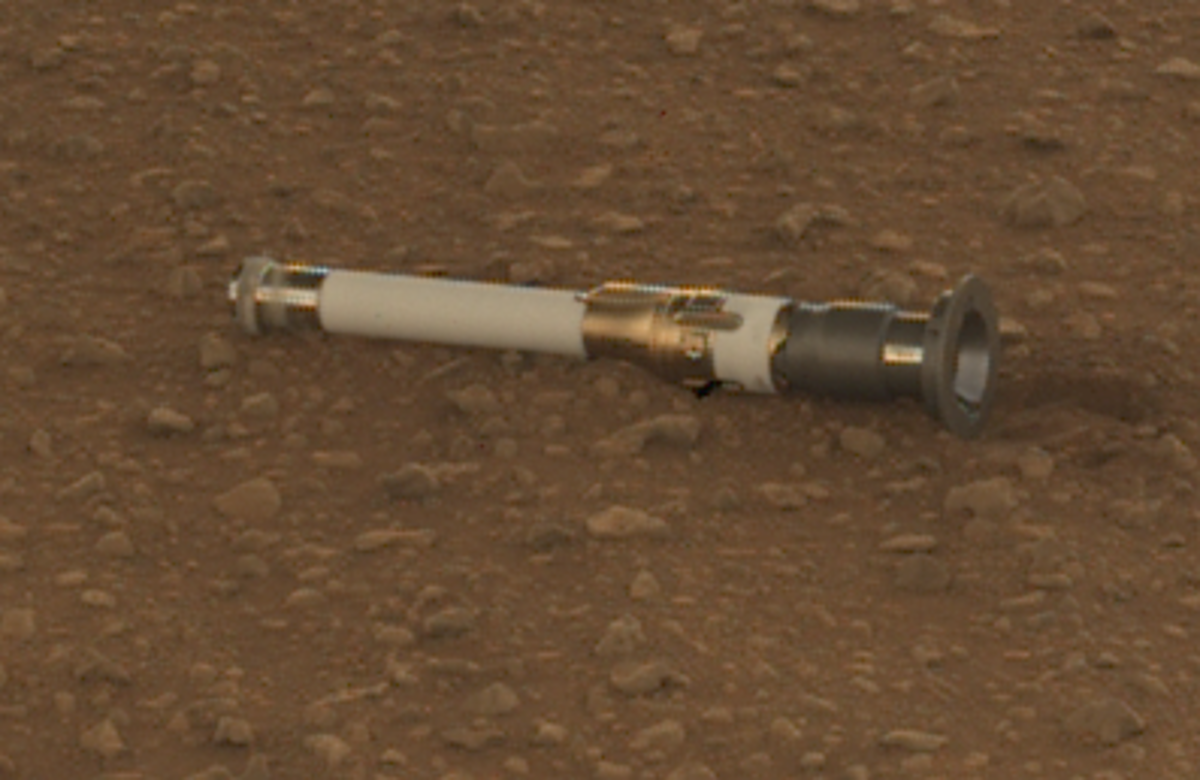
First Sample

- 21 June 2021 (Sol 120): Sealing of witness tube 1 of 5. Unlike the others, this tube was (intentionally) left unsealed before the mission left Earth.
- 6 August 2021 (Sol 164): Sealing of sample tube 1 of 38. Attempted to take a rock sample, but only captured atmospheric gasses.
- 6 September 2021 (Sol 195): Sealing of sample tube 2 of 38. This was the first successful rock sample.
- 8 September 2021 (Sol 197): Sealing of sample tube 3 of 38. Sampled from the same rock.
- 15 November 2021 (Sol 263): Sealing of sample tube 4 of 38.
- 24 November 2021 (Sol 272): Sealing of sample tube 5 of 38.
- 22 December 2021 (Sol 299): Sealing of sample tube 6 of 38.
- 29 December 2021 (Sol 307): Failed attempt at collecting the 7th sample.
- 31 January 2022 (Sol 338): Sealing of sample tube 7 of 38. The same tube as the previous failed attempt was used, after dumping out the contents.
- 7 March 2022 (Sol 372): Sealing of sample tube 8 of 38.
- 13 March 2022 (Sol 378): Sealing of sample tube 9 of 38.
- 7 July 2022 (Sol 491): Sealing of sample tube 10 of 38. This was the first sedimentary rock sample taken by Perseverance.
- 12 July 2022 (Sol 495): Sealing of sample tube 11 of 38.
- 16 July 2022 (Sol 499): Sealing of witness tube 2 of 5.
- 27 July 2022 (Sol 510): Sealing of sample tube 12 of 38.
- 3 August 2022 (Sol 510): Sealing of sample tube 13 of 38.
- 2 October 2022 (Sol 575): Sealing of sample tube 14 of 38.
- 5 October 2022 (Sol 578): The 14th rock sample (15th overall, named 'Mageik') was cored; however, the rover was not able to seal the sample. The third witness tube was also opened.
- 14 October 2022 (Sol 584): Due to a fault, witness tube 3 was left exposed to the Martian environment much longer than planned.
- 14 October 2022 (Sol 586): Sealing of witness tube 3 of 5.
- 16 November 2022 (Sol 589): Sealing of sample tube 15 of 38. After several attempts, the Mageik sample was successfully sealed.
- 29 November 2022 (Sol 632): Sealing of sample tube 16 of 38.
- 2 December 2022 (Sol 635): Sealing of sample tube 17 of 38.
- 7 December 2022 (Sol 639): Sealing of sample tube 18 of 38.
- 7 December 2022 (Sol 639): Sealing of sample tube 18 of 38.
- 21 December 2022 – 28 January 2023 (Sol 653–690): Perseverance creates the Three Forks sample depot, leaving behind 10 of the previously collected tubes at various locations in Jezero Crater.
- 30 March 2023 (Sol 749): Sealing of sample tube 19 of 38.
- 23 May 2023 (Sol 802): The first attempt at filling sample tube 20; the sample collected was too small.
- 4 June 2023 (Sol 814): The second attempt at filling sample tube 20.
- 23 June 2023 (Sol 832): Sealing of sample tube 20 of 38. Successfully cached a conglomerate sedimentary rock sample after two previous attempts.
- 27 July 2023 (Sol 865): The first attempt at filling sample tube 21.
- 15 September 2023 (Sol 914): Sealing of sample tube 21 of 38. Sampling succeeded on the second attempt.
- 23 September 2023 (Sol 922): Sealing of sample tube 22 of 38.
- 21 October 2023 (Sol 949): Sealing of sample tube 23 of 38.
- 11 March 2024 (Sol 1087): Sealing of sample tube 24 of 38.
- 21 June 2024 (Sol 1216): Sealing of sample tube 25 of 38. This sample is believed to contain potential biosignatures.
- Before November 2024: NASA determined that the use of two (non-witness) sample tubes would pose a risk to the mission, due to the risk of wires on the robot arm catching on the fasteners.
- 28 January 2025 (Sol 1401): Sealing of sample tube 26 of 36.
- 2 March 2025 (Sol 1434): Sealing of sample tube 27 of 36.
- 10 March 2025 (Sol 1441): Sealing of sample tube 28 of 36.
- 7 May 2025 (Sol 1498): Collection of sample tube 29 of 36. This sample has been left unsealed on purpose; this way, Perseverance can replace it with another sample if needed.
- 2 July 2025 (Sol 1552): Collection of sample tube 30 of 36. This sample has been left unsealed on purpose.

== Timeline of Ingenuity flights ==
- 19 April 2021 (Sol 58): Flight 1. Ingenuity reached a height of 3 meters and lasts for 39 seconds.
- 22 April 2021 (Sol 61): Flight 2. The first flight to include horizontal displacement.
- 25 April 2021 (Sol 64): Flight 3. The final 'technology demonstration' flight.
- 29 April 2021 (Sol 68): An attempt to fly failed due to a software error.
- 30 April 2021 (Sol 69): Flight 4. Ingenuity traveled almost three times as far as all previous flights combined.
- 7 May 2021 (Sol 76): Flight 5. The first to land at a new location.
- 23 May 2021 (Sol 91): Flight 6. An error with the handling of data from the color camera caused the helicopter to land 5 meters away from the planned destination.
- 6 June 2021 (Sol 105): An attempt to fly failed due to a software error.
- 8 June 2021 (Sol 107): Flight 7. The color camera was not used during this flight, in an effort to avoid the error that caused the previous failure.
- 22 June 2021 (Sol 120): Flight 8. The color camera was still not used during this flight.
- 5 July 2021 (Sol 133): Flight 9. Ingenuity flew over sand dunes, which caused the flight to land 47 meters off target.
- 24 July 2021 (Sol 152): Flight 10.
- 5 August 2021 (Sol 163): Flight 11. The landing region, named 'Airfield H', would be the starting location for the next four flights.
- 16 August 2021 (Sol 174): Flight 12. This flight was the longest yet, lasting 170 seconds.
- 5 September 2021 (Sol 193): Flight 13.
- 18 September 2021 (Sol 206): An attempt to fly was cancelled due to a servo motor anomaly.
- 24 October 2021 (Sol 241): Flight 14. Ingenuity used a faster rotor spin of 2700 rpm; this was necessary due to the seasonal lowering of Mars' atmospheric density.
- 6 November 2021 (Sol 254): Flight 15. During this flight, Ingenuity departed from Airfield H for the last time.
- 21 November 2021 (Sol 268): Flight 16.
- 5 December 2021 (Sol 282): Flight 17. Ingenuity lost communications with the rover at the end of the flight, although it was later recovered.
- 15 December 2021 (Sol 292): Flight 18.
- 5 January 2022 – February 7, 2022 (Sol 312–344): A dust storm, and the complications arising from it, prevent Ingenuity from flying.
- 8 February 2022 (Sol 345): Flight 19.
- 25 February 2022 (Sol 362): Flight 20.
- 10 March 2022 (Sol 375): Flight 21. Ingenuity did not fly as far as planned, managing only 70 meters of a planned 350 meter flight.
- 20 March 2022 (Sol 384): Flight 22.
- 24 March 2022 (Sol 388): Flight 23.
- 3 April 2022 (Sol 398): Flight 24. For the first time since Sol 241, the rotor spun at a lower rate. This was due to the Martian fall having denser air than the summer.
- 8 April 2022 (Sol 403): Flight 25. Ingenuity flew for a record distance of 709 meters.
- 19 April 2022 (Sol 414): Flight 26.
- 23 April 2022 (Sol 418): Flight 27.
- 29 April 2022 (Sol 423): Flight 28.
- 11 June 2022 (Sol 465): Flight 29. From this flight onwards, Ingenuity's inclinometer no longer worked.
- 20 August 2022 (Sol 533): Flight 30.
- 6 September 2022 (Sol 550): Flight 31.
- 18 September 2022 (Sol 561): Flight 32.
- 24 September 2022 (Sol 567): Flight 33. A small foreign object was seen attached to part of Ingenuity's leg at the beginning of the flight, although it fell off midway through the flight and caused no damage.
- 23 November 2022 (Sol 625): Flight 34. The first flight after Ingenuity received a software update to allow it to better handle rocky, hilly terrain.
- 3 December 2022 (Sol 635): Flight 35.
- 10 December 2022 (Sol 642): Flight 36.
- 17 December 2022 (Sol 649): Flight 37.
- 24 December 2022 (Sol 656): An attempt to fly failed due to an oncoming dust storm.
- 5 January 2023 (Sol 667): Flight 38.
- 11 January 2023 (Sol 673): Flight 39.
- 19 January 2023 (Sol 681): Flight 40. With the exception the first airfield, "Wright Brother's Field", all airfields had been named according to the Latin alphabet. This was the first flight to break that tradition, moving from Airfield Z to Airfield Beta.
- 27 January 2023 (Sol 689): Flight 41.
- 5 February 2023 (Sol 697): Flight 42.
- 16 February 2023 (Sol 708): Flight 43. This was the first of a series of flights aimed to stay ahead of Perseverance; in the current terrain, falling behind Perseverance would likely result in being unable to fly Ingenuity again due to the risk of collision with the rover.
- 19 February 2023 (Sol 711): Flight 44.
- 22 February 2023 (Sol 714): Flight 45.
- 25 February 2023 (Sol 717): Flight 46.
- 9 March 2023 (Sol 729): Flight 47.
- 22 March 2023 (Sol 741): Flight 48.
- 23 March 2023 – 1 April 2023 (Sol 742–751): A series of flight attempts fail due to various issues.
- 1 April 2023 (Sol 752): Flight 49.
- 13 April 2023 (Sol 763): Flight 50. Ingenuity achieved a new altitude record of 18 meters.
- 23 April 2023 (Sol 772): Flight 51.
- 27 April 2023 (Sol 776): Flight 52.
- 27 April 2023 – 28 June 2023 (Sol 776–837): Contact lost with Ingenuity due to a hill blocking radio signals.
- 22 July 2023 (Sol 860): Flight 53. Aborted early; this was the first in-flight abort performed by Ingenuity.
- 4 August 2023 (Sol 873): Flight 54. A very brief flight to validate software modifications made in the wake of the previous flight's abort.
- 12 August 2023 (Sol 873): Flight 55.
- 26 August 2023 (Sol 894): Flight 56.
- 3 September 2023 (Sol 902): Flight 57.
- 11 September 2023 (Sol 910): Flight 58.
- 16 September 2023 (Sol 915): Flight 59. Achieved a record altitude of 20 meters. The first in a series of envelope-expansion flights.
- 26 September 2023 (Sol 924): Flight 60.
- 5 October 2023 (Sol 933): Flight 61. Achieved a record altitude of 24 meters.
- 12 October 2023 (Sol 940): Flight 62. Achieved a record groundspeed of 10 meters per second.
- 19 October 2023 (Sol 947): Flight 63.
- 27 October 2023 (Sol 955): Flight 64.
- 2 November 2023 (Sol 960): Flight 65.
- 3 November 2023 (Sol 961): Flight 66.
- 11 November 2023 – 25 November 2023 (Sol 969–983): Solar conjunction disrupts communication between Earth and Mars.
- 2 December 2023 (Sol 990): Flight 67.
- 15 December 2023 (Sol 1002): Flight 68.
- 20 December 2023 (Sol 1007): Flight 69.
- 22 December 2023 (Sol 1009): Flight 70.
- 6 January 2024 (Sol 1023): Flight 71. This flight terminated early.
- 18 January 2024 (Sol 1035): Flight 72. The final flight of Ingenuity; contact with the rover was lost early. It was later discovered that Ingenuity took fatal damage to its rotor blades.
- 25 January 2024 (Sol 1043): NASA declares the end of Ingenuity's mission.
- 2 February 2026: The computer chip Perseverance used to communicated with Ingenuity is repurposed for use in a compute-intensive visual odometry algorithm.

== See also ==
- Astrobiology
- Composition of Mars
- Curiosity rover
- Exploration of Mars
- Geography of Mars
- Geology of Mars
- InSight lander
- List of missions to Mars
- List of rocks on Mars
- Mars Exploration Rover
- Mars Express orbiter
- Mars Odyssey Orbiter
- Mars Orbiter Mission
- Mars Pathfinder (Sojourner rover)
- Mars Reconnaissance Orbiter
- Mars 2020 rover mission
- MAVEN orbiter
- Moons of Mars
- Phoenix lander
- Robotic spacecraft
- Scientific information from the Mars Exploration Rover mission
- Space exploration
- Timeline of Mars Science Laboratory
- U.S. Space Exploration History on U.S. Stamps
- Viking program
- Water on Mars
