= List of Ingenuity flights =

List of flights by the Martian helicopter Ingenuity

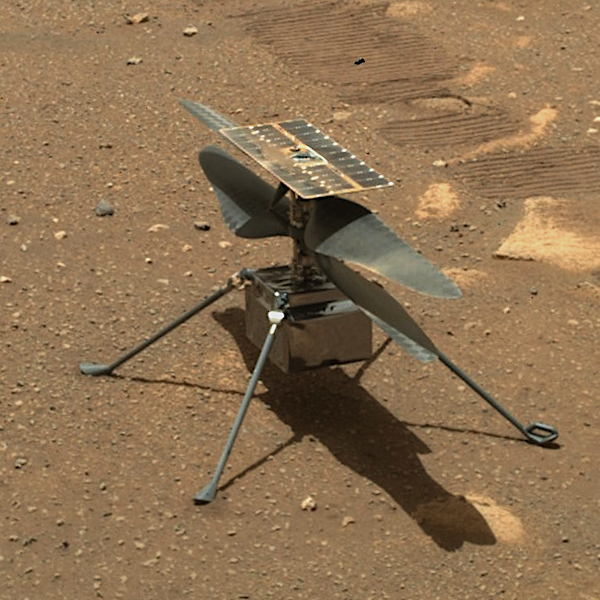
Ingenuity helicopter at Wright Brothers Field on Mars before first flight

The NASA helicopter Ingenuity on Mars made the first powered controlled flights by an aircraft on a planet other than Earth. It first flew on April 19, 2021, after landing on February 18 attached to the underside of the Perseverance rover. Ingenuity weighs 1.8 kilograms (4.0 lb) and is 49 cm (19 in) tall. It is powered by six lithium-ion solar-charged batteries. It was built and operated by the Jet Propulsion Laboratory (JPL), a field center of NASA. Ingenuity was designed to fly five times in 30 Mars sols (31 Earth days), but operated far above expectations, making its 72nd and final flight on January 18, 2024 (UTC), 977 Mars sols (1,004 Earth days) after its first flight. Its rotor blades were damaged on the last flight's landing, causing NASA to retire the craft. Mission engineers determined that Ingenuity’s navigation system could not provide accurate data during the flight over featureless terrain, resulting in an off-balance hard landing.

== List of flights ==
 Record values highlighted
Data sources:
- "Flight Log". Mars Helicopter Tech Demo. NASA. April 8, 2024.
- "m20 heli waypoints" NASA

#	Date (UTC)	Duration (sec)	Altitude	Distance	Max Ground Speed	Route	Summary
Technology Demonstration Phase
1	April 19, 2021 at 07:34 (Sol 58)	39.1	3 m (9.8 ft)	0.05 m (0.16 ft)	0 m/s (0 mph)	Vertical takeoff, hover, land at Wright Brothers Field (JZRO) 18.44486°N 77.45102°E	The first powered flight by any aircraft on another planet. While hovering, it rotated in place 96 degrees in a planned manoeuvre. Flight data was received at 11:30 UTC.
2	April 22, 2021 at 09:32 (Sol 61)	51.9	5 m (16 ft)	4 m (13 ft) Roundtrip	0.5 m/s (1.1 mph)	Hover, shift westward 2 m (6.6 ft), hover, return, hover, land within JZRO 18.44486°N 77.45102°E	From initial hover, it tilted 5 degrees, allowing rotors to fly it 2 meters sideways. It stopped, hovered in place, and rotated counterclockwise, yawing from +90° to 0° to -90° to -180°, in 3 steps, to point its color camera in various directions to take photos. It flew back to the takeoff location and landed.
3	April 25, 2021 at 11:31 (Sol 64)	80.3	5 m (16 ft)	99.97 m (328.0 ft) Roundtrip	2 m/s (4.5 mph)	Hover, shift northward 49.98 m (164.0 ft), return, hover, land within JZRO 18.44486°N 77.45101°E	First flight to venture some distance from the deployment spot. It flew downrange 50 meters at two meters per second, stopped, hovered, then returned and landed at the departure spot. Data from the flight was received at 14:16 UTC.
Transition Phase
4	April 29, 2021 (Sol 68)	First attempt of flight 4 failed; onboard software did not transition to flight mode.					
4	April 30, 2021 at 14:49 (Sol 69)	116.9	5 m (16 ft)	270.46 m (887.3 ft) Roundtrip	3.5 m/s (7.8 mph)	Hover, shift southward 135.23 m (443.7 ft), hover, return, hover, land within JZRO 18.44486°N 77.45112°E	Took color images while hovering at its farthest point from takeoff. The Perseverance rover recorded both audio and video of Ingenuity in flight, making the helicopter the first interplanetary vehicle whose sound was recorded off Earth.
5	May 7, 2021 at 19:26 (Sol 76)	108.2	10 m (33 ft)	130.84 m (429.3 ft)	2 m/s (4.5 mph)	Hover, shift southwards 130.84 m (429.3 ft), climb to 10 m (33 ft), hover, land at Airfield B 18.44267°N 77.45139°E	This was the first flight to land at a new location, 129 m (423 ft) to the south. Arriving above the destination, it gained altitude, hovered, captured color terrain images, then landed at the new site, Airfield B. This flight was the last in the technology demonstration phase.
Operation Demonstration Phase
6	May 23, 2021 at 5:20 (Sol 91)	139.9	10 m (33 ft)	202.39 m (664.0 ft) with direction changes)	4 m/s (8.9 mph)	Shift southwest about 140.9 m (462 ft), southward about 14.1 m (46 ft), northeast about 46.8 m (154 ft), land at Airfield C 18.44166°N 77.44994°E	At each turn into the flight, colour images were taken. Near the end of the first leg of the route at 54 seconds into flight, a glitch occurred in the navigation images processing system. An image was dropped, and subsequent images with incorrect timestamps resulted in the craft tilting forward and backward up to 20 degrees, with large spikes in power consumption. It flew in that mode until successfully landing about 5 m (16 ft) away from the planned spot, after turning off navigation camera and flying on IMU. This was the first time the helicopter had to land at an airfield which was not surveyed by any means other than MRO satellite imagery.
7	June 6, 2021 (Sol 105)	First attempt of flight 7 failed; onboard software did not transition to flight mode.					
7	June 8, 2021 at 15:54 (Sol 107)	62.8	10 m (33 ft)	106.34 m (348.9 ft)	4 m/s (8.9 mph)	Shift southward 106.3 m (349 ft) to land at Airfield D 18.43988°N 77.45015°E	Flew to a new landing spot, Airfield D. The color camera was not used to prevent the glitch of flight 6 happening again.
8	June 22, 2021 at 00:28 (Sol 120)	77.4	10 m (33 ft)	160.48 m (526.5 ft)	4 m/s (8.9 mph)	Shift south south-east 160.48 m (526.5 ft) to land at Airfield E 18.43724°N 77.45079°E	The landing spot was about 133.5 m (438 ft) away from the Perseverance rover. As in the previous flight, the color camera was switched off, pending a software update.
9	July 5, 2021 at 9:03 (Sol 133)	166.4	10 m (33 ft)	631.78 m (2,072.8 ft)	5 m/s (11 mph)	Shift southwest 631.79 m (2,070 ft) to Airfield F 18.42809°N 77.44545°E	Flew southwest, over Séítah, a prospective research location in Jezero crater. This flight strained the navigation system, which by design assumes flat ground; Séítah has uneven sand dunes. Controllers had Ingenuity partly compensate by flying slower over the more challenging part of the route. Landing occurred 47 m (154 ft) from the center of the 50 m (160 ft) planned ellipse.
10	July 24, 2021 at 21:05 (Sol 152)	165.4	12 m (39 ft)	240.37 m (788.6 ft)	5 m/s (11 mph)	Loop south and west over prospective research location Raised Ridges to Airfield G 18.42808°N 77.44373°E	The helicopter flew past 10 waypoints, including takeoff and landing. The general trajectory of the 10th flight was four chords of a broken oval, thus distance between the takeoff and landing points of about 95 meters.
11	August 5, 2021 at 4:53 (Sol 163)	130.9	12 m (39 ft)	388.29 m (1,273.9 ft)	5 m/s (11 mph)	Shift northwest 388.29 m (1,273.9 ft) to land at Airfield H 18.43278°N 77.43919°E	The flight positioned the craft for a route to take photographs of South Séítah. The airfield " H " was the second after "Wright Brothers Field" in terms of the number of departures, and in terms of the total length (1069 m) and duration of these flights (481.8 s), as well as the parking time of the helicopter (3 months, from August 5 to November 6) airfield " H " even outstripped the cradle of Martian aeronautics.
12	August 16, 2021 at 12:57 (Sol 174)	169.5	10 m (33 ft)	448.21 m (1,470.5 ft) Roundtrip	4.3 m/s (9.6 mph)	Takeoff and return, land within Airfield H 18.43268°N 77.43924°E	The return path was about 5 m (16 ft) to the side to allow another attempt to take paired images for stereo imagery. Landing was about 25 m (82 ft) east from the take-off point. This flight was decisive for the subsequent fate of the helicopter, which then got its mission extended after August. It captured images used to scout the South Seitha region which had been under consideration for future rover investigation, but proved less interesting than hoped.
13	September 5, 2021 at 0:10 (Sol 193)	160.5	8 m (26 ft)	209.4 m (687 ft) Roundtrip	3.3 m/s (7.4 mph)	Takeoff and return, land within Airfield H 18.43285°N 77.43915°E	The flight northeast and back concentrated on one particular ridgeline and outcrops in South Séítah.
14	September 18, 2021 (Sol 206)	A flight attempt at a faster rotor spin rate of 2700 rpm was automatically canceled due to a servo motor anomaly. Three days earlier, September 15, Ingenuity successfully ground tested a rotor spin rate of 2800 rpm. Servo motor "wiggle" tests were done on September 21 and 23 to diagnose the problem that prevented flight. More ground tests and another flight attempt were postponed until after solar conjunction. Then, on October 21, NASA/JPL reported a successful 50 rpm ground test. Ingenuity made its 14th flight three days later.					
14	October 24, 2021 at 8:18 (Sol 241)	23.0	5 m (16 ft)	2.18 m (7.2 ft)	0.5 m/s (1.1 mph)	Dogleg eastwards 2.18 m (7.2 ft), land within Airfield H 18.43284°N 77.43920°E	The brief flight verified use of the faster rotor spin of 2700 rpm, needed during seasonal lower atmospheric density on Mars.
15	November 6, 2021 at 16:22 (Sol 254)	128.8	12 m (39 ft)	410.27 m (1,346.0 ft)	5 m/s (11 mph)	Shift southeast 411.3 m (1,349 ft) to land at Airfield F 18.42871°N 77.44501°E	First in a series of four to seven flights on a return journey to Wright Brothers Field, due to the low atmospheric pressure and varied relief features. This leg ended in the Raised Ridges region.
16	November 21, 2021 at 02:08 (Sol 268)	107.9	10 m (33 ft)	116.99 m (383.8 ft)	1.5 m/s (3.4 mph)	Shift northeast 116.99 m (383.8 ft) to land at Airfield J 18.43013°N 77.44645°E	Landed near the edge of South Séítah, prior to crossing that area on multiple impending flights.
17	December 5, 2021 at 12:25 (Sol 282)	116.8	10 m (33 ft)	187.36 m (614.7 ft)	2.5 m/s (5.6 mph)	Shift northeast 187.7 m (616 ft) to land at Airfield K 18.43306°N 77.44771°E	Flew halfway across South Séítah along the heading of flight 9 but in the reverse direction. The helicopter lost communication with the rover during final descent, roughly 3 m (10 ft) above the ground due to 5-meter Bras outcrop ib between, but JPL believed the flight was a success, based on available telemetry. On Sol 285, Ingenuity relayed more information which suggested the helicopter was upright, based on the solar arrays charging the batteries, which could not be done if the helicopter fell sideways. JPL said local terrain and Perseverance positioning probably interrupted communication.
18	December 15, 2021 at 17:27 (Sol 292)	124.3	10 m (33 ft)	231.56 m (759.7 ft)	2.5 m/s (5.6 mph)	Shift northeast 231.8 m (760 ft) to land near the northern edge of South Séítah at Airfield L 18.43623°N 77.45011°E	Flew across South Séítah in the reverse of the flight 9 heading and landed near flight 9 takeoff spot. This was another in a series of flights returning Ingenuity to Wright Brothers Field. Airfield L has featureless sandy terrain, chosen for the lack of rocks for safe landing. The area is actually so devoid of rock that the helicopter sent warnings due to insufficient features for the vision navigation to track. JPL planned to update software fault protection parameters to reduce the risk of a premature landing on Flight 19.
19	Originally planned for January 5, 2022 (Sol 312); rescheduled for January 23 (Sol 330); flown on February 8, 2022 (Sol 345).	The first attempt of flight 19 was postponed due to a dust storm approaching Jezero Crater, the first time weather delayed a flight of an airborne vehicle on a celestial object other than Earth. The storm reduced sunlight by 18 percent on Ingenuity's solar array, which charges its batteries, and warm dust lowered the surrounding air density by seven percent, which could have exceeded Ingenuity's ability to generate adequate lift. JPL waited over a month for the air to clear and the helicopter to regain its pre-storm power generating ability. The storm deposited dust on the navigation camera window. To prevent navigation errors, JPL uploaded a new image mask file in late January that ignores certain regions of the image. Dust and sand also accumulated in all the swashplate assemblies. Repeated actuator self-tests and servo-wiggles cleared the debris.					
19	February 8, 2022 at 04:21 (Sol 345)	99.8	10 m (33 ft)	61.19 m (200.8 ft)	1 m/s (2.2 mph)	Shift northeast 61.6 m (202 ft) to land just above the eastern ridge of South Séítah at Airfield E 18.43700°N 77.45080°E	The helicopter flew out of South Séítah basin, across a dividing ridge and up to the main plateau, near the landing site of Flight 8. Images taken during Flight 9 were used to select a safe zone. The flight was another in a series to return to Wright Brothers Field. This gradual approach is due to lack of large landing sites in the area and lower atmospheric density in the summer, which requires higher rotor speeds and more power. The flight plan called for the helicopter to turn nearly 180 degrees before landing to aim its color camera toward the river delta for future flights.
20	February 25, 2022 at 13:34 (Sol 362)	130.3	10 m (33 ft)	392.27 m (1,287.0 ft)	4.4 m/s (9.8 mph)	Shift northwest 392.27 m (1,287.0 ft) flying across Séítah to land at Airfield M 18.44337°N 77.44859°E	Ingenuity continued its journey back toward its original flight zone, landing just southwest of Wright Brothers Field. From there, it will take a shortcut to the Jezero Crater river delta, flying northwest across Séítah, while Perseverance drives around the region to the "Three Forks" a at the foot of the slopes, on the tops of which three dry channels (sleeves) of the Neretva flow. The latest auto-navigation system allows Perseverance to break away from Ingenuity in a few sols, and therefore the helicopter had to go on a campaign first and in advance.
21	March 10, 2022 at 22:10 (Sol 375)	129.2	10 m (33 ft)	374.4 m (1,228 ft)	3.85 m/s (8.6 mph)	Shift northwest flying across Séítah to land at Airfield N 18.44514°N 77.44219°E	First in a series of flights to a position near the base of the ancient river delta in Jezero Crater to scout ahead for Perseverance.
22	March 20, 2022 at 4:06 (Sol 384)	101.4	10 m (33 ft)	70.4 m (231 ft)	1 m/s (2.2 mph)	Dogleg northeast across northwest Séítah, landing back within Airfield N 18.44610°N 77.44292°E	Second flight toward position near base of the delta. Ingenuity flew only 70.4 m (231 ft), not the planned ~350 m (1,150 ft).
23	March 24, 2022 at 6:44 (Sol 388)	129.1	10 m (33 ft)	374.886 m (1,229.94 ft)	4 m/s (8.9 mph)	Shift northeast and then northwest flying across Séítah to land at Airfield P 18.44508°N 77.44345°E	Another flight on the way to a position near the base of the delta. The flight was complex, including a sharp turn to avoid a large hill. In deciding the remaining route to the delta, the mission team considered multiple factors: thermal (temperature of helicopter parts), atmospheric, flight time, navigation drift, landing site terrain, and keeping up with the rover.
24	April 3, 2022 at 12:49 (Sol 398)	69.8	10 m (33 ft)	47.54 m (156.0 ft)	1.45 m/s (3.2 mph)	Shift northwest flying across Séítah to land within Airfield P 18.44508°N 77.44246°E	Fourth of five sorties crossing the Séítah region. Rotors spun at 2,537 rpm, a reduction from 2,700 rpm used since flight 14; this was a return to the slower rate of the earliest flights. Increasing air density allowed the reduction, as the thin air of the ending Martian summer was being replaced by fall's denser air. The short flight positioned Ingenuity for a long flight to approach its destination near the delta. The date of flight 24 marked one year since Ingenuity's deployment to the surface from Perseverance.
25	April 8, 2022 at 16:40 (Sol 403)	161.3	10 m (33 ft)	708.91 m (2,325.8 ft)	5.50 m/s (12.3 mph)	Shift northwest flying over Séítah, landing at staging area Airfield Q 18.45477°N 77.43058°E	Longest distance of any flight. The mission team chose a route that avoided flying over hardware that was discarded and fell to the surface during the rover's entry-descent-landing (EDL) and might have caused unexpected performance from Ingenuity's laser altimeter and visual navigation system. This flight brought the helicopter out of the Séítah region.
26	April 19, 2022 at 1:32 (Sol 414)	159.0	8 m (26 ft)	391.18 m (1,283.4 ft)	3.80 m/s (8.5 mph)	Shift southeast, southwest, and then northwest to land at Airfield R 18.45163°N 77.43046°E	Ingenuity flew closer to the delta and took color photos of the EDL debris, including the spacecraft backshell and parachute.
27	April 23, 2022 at 4:11 (Sol 418)	153.9	10 m (33 ft)	304.96 m (1,000.5 ft)	3 m/s (6.7 mph)	Shift slightly southeast, then southwest, and then northwest to land at Airfield S 18.45252°N 77.42636°E	Ingenuity flew closer to the delta capturing the images of crater ridgeline.
28	April 29, 2022 at 7:44 (Sol 423)	152.9	10 m (33 ft)	420.94 m (1,381.0 ft)	3.6 m/s (8.1 mph)	Shift northwest to land at Airfield T 18.45714°N 77.42068°E	Ingenuity flew closer to the delta. This flight was the fifth in April - there has not been such an intensity of flights since the demonstration program, when 4 flights were made in April 2021.
29	May 26, 2022 (Sol 450)	High-speed spin test of the rotor blades.					
29	June 11, 2022 at 15:06 (Sol 465)	66.6	10 m (33 ft)	181.96 m (597.0 ft)	5.50 m/s (12.3 mph)	Shift southwest to land at Airfield U 18.45597°N 77.41768°E	First flight without the use of its inclinometer and in the cold of Martian winter.
30	August 6, 2022 (Sol 520) and August 15, 2022 (Sol 528)	One low-speed spin test of 50 rpm and one high-speed spin test of 2,573 rpm of the rotor blades to take a health check of the helicopter after it endured sandstorms and temperatures as low as −124 °F (−87 °C) during the Martian winter.					
30	August 20, 2022 at 12:38 (Sol 533)	33.3	5 m (16 ft)	2.35 m (7.7 ft)	0.5 m/s (1.1 mph)	Dogleg sideways and land within Airfield U 18.455973°N 77.41764°E	First flight after the dust season and first in more than two months. Intended to measure how accurately Ingenuity can still fly to a specified target after a long period of inactivity.
31	September 6, 2022 at 23:31 (Sol 550)	55.6	10 m (33 ft)	97.2 m (319 ft)	4.75 m/s (10.6 mph)	Shift westwards and land at Airfield V 18.455821°N 77.415911°E	Reposition helicopter.
32	September 18, 2022 at 6:46 (Sol 561)	55.3	10 m (33 ft)	94.36 m (309.6 ft)	4.75 m/s (10.6 mph)	Shift northwestwards and land at Airfield W 18.455924°N 77.414237°E	Continue west near edge of delta
33	September 24, 2022 at 11:15 (Sol 567)	55.6	10 m (33 ft)	112.28 m (368.4 ft)	4.75 m/s (10.6 mph)	Shift westwards and land at Airfield X 18.455623°N 77.412265°E	Reposition the helicopter. A small piece of foreign object debris (FOD) was seen clinging to the bottom right leg of the helicopter in footage from the navigation camera (Navcam) for a portion of this flight. It was not visible in Navcam footage from the previous flight. The debris is from the earliest frames to approximately halfway through the video, when it fell from the leg and drifted back to the Mars surface. All telemetry from the flight and a post-flight search were normal and showed no indication of vehicle damage. JPL tried to find the source of the debris.
34	November 23, 2022 at 01:25 (Sol 625)	18.3	5 m (16 ft)	0.12 m (0.39 ft)	0 m/s (0 mph)	Hover and land again at Airfield X 18.455623°N 77.412265°E	A test of its fourth software update, with advanced navigation capabilities allowing it to safely fly up the steep terrain of the Jezero river delta, scouting ahead of the Perseverance rover.
35	December 3, 2022 at 08:26 (Sol 635)	52.22	14 m (46 ft)	15.05 m (49.4 ft)	3 m/s (6.7 mph)	Hover and land within Airfield X 18.455814°N 77.412090°E	Reposition helicopter.
36	December 10, 2022 at 12:57 (Sol 642)	60.52	10 m (33 ft)	110.32 m (361.9 ft); Roundtrip	5.5 m/s (12 mph)	Dogleg northwest 55 m (180 ft), returning again to Airfield X 18.455806°N 77.412087°E	Reposition helicopter.
37	December 17, 2022 at 17:34 (Sol 649)	55.2	10 m (33 ft)	62 m (203 ft)	3 m/s (6.7 mph)	Shift northwest to land at Airfield Y 18.456524°N 77.411518°E	Reposition helicopter.
38	December 24, 2022 (Sol 656)	The first flight 38 attempt was rejected after onboard software did not transition to flight mode because of the approach of a short, but severe, dust storm.					
38	January 5, 2023 at 05:28 (Sol 667)	74.26	10 m (33 ft)	101.62 m (333.4 ft)	3.5 m/s (7.8 mph)	Shift northwest to land at Airfield Z 18.457278°N 77.409895°E	Reposition helicopter. It landed in between the sand dunes as seen by Perseverance.
39	January 11, 2023 at 10:05 (Sol 673)	78.7	10 m (33 ft)	143.76 m (471.7 ft); Roundtrip	4 m/s (8.9 mph)	Dogleg northeast ~70 m (230 ft), returning to Airfield Z 18.457253°N 77.409888°E	Test new flight software.
40	January 19, 2023 at 15:03 (Sol 681)	91.6	10 m (33 ft)	177.49 m (582.3 ft)	3.20 m/s (7.2 mph)	Shift northwest to Airfield Beta (β) 18.458697°N 77.407122°E	Reposition helicopter.
41	January 27, 2023 at 19:27 (Sol 689)	109.1	10 m (33 ft)	181.35 m (595.0 ft); Roundtrip	3 m/s (6.7 mph)	Dogleg northwest ~91 m (299 ft) landing back within Airfield Beta (β) 18.459015°N 77.407090°E	Scouting for Perseverance and photographing science targets.
42	February 5, 2023 at 00:52 (Sol 697)	137.2	10 m (33 ft)	255.47 m (838.2 ft)	3 m/s (6.7 mph)	Shift northwest and land at Airfield Gamma (γ) 18.461712°N 77.403799°E	Scouting for Perseverance and photographing science targets.
43	February 16, 2023 at 08:03 (Sol 708)	146	12 m (39 ft)	390 m (1,280 ft)	4 m/s (8.9 mph)	Shift northwest and land at Airfield Epsilon (ε) 18.467098°N 77.400395°E	Ingenuity commenced a series of frequent flights from this point through March to keep ahead of Perseverance, whose large no-fly exclusion zone prevents the two passing in the confines of the canyon.Ingenuity must stay ahead of Perseverance in order to scout for it. It also photographs science targets en route.
44	February 19, 2023 at 10:04 (Sol 711)	141.26	12 m (39 ft)	324.12 m (1,063.4 ft)	3.5 m/s (7.8 mph)	Shift northwest and land at Airfield Zeta (ζ) 18.472231°N 77.398408°E	Scouting, keeping ahead of Perseverance in the canyon, and photographing science targets.
45	February 22, 2023 at 13:05 (Sol 714)	144.54	12 m (39 ft)	502.6 m (1,649 ft) (with directional changes)	6 m/s (13 mph)	Shift northwards, then northwest and land at Airfield Eta (η) 18.477147°N 77.392375°E	Scouting, keeping ahead of Perseverance in the canyon, and photographing science targets.
46	February 25, 2023 at 14:03 (Sol 717)	135.86	12 m (39 ft)	445.381 m (1,461.22 ft) (with directional changes)	5.30 m/s (11.9 mph)	Shift southwest, then northeast and land at Airfield Theta (θ) 18.475128°N 77.387830°E	Scouting, keeping ahead of Perseverance in the canyon, and photographing science targets.
47	March 9, 2023 at 21:58 (Sol 729)	138.69	12 m (39 ft)	449.75 m (1,475.6 ft) (with directional changes)	5.30 m/s (11.9 mph)	Shift southwest, then westwards and land at Airfield Iota (ι) 18.471497°N 77.381368°E	Scouting Tenby, though the color camera narrowly missed the main area of interest by a few degrees outside the field of view; keeping ahead of Perseverance in the canyon; and photographing science targets. Imaged by Perseverance while taking off from Airfield Theta (θ).
48	March 22, 2023 at 04:56 (Sol 741)	149.90	12 m (39 ft)	387.56 m (1,271.5 ft) (with directional changes)	4.65 m/s (10.4 mph)	Shift northwest and land at Airfield Kappa (κ) 18.474483°N 77.376720°E	Scouting Castell Henllys successfully, producing high resolution pictures of the area, keeping ahead of Perseverance in the canyon, and photographing science targets.
49	Between March 22, 2023 (Sol 741) and April 2, 2023 (Sol 752)	Two aborted flight attempts, the first due to high winds cooling the battery below preflight check levels, and the second due to a minor command sequencing glitch.					
49	April 2, 2023 at 12:05 (Sol 752)	142.71	16 m (52 ft)	278.99 m (915.3 ft) (with directional changes)	6.5 m/s (15 mph)	Shift northwest, then sharp turn to northeasteast and land at Airfield Lambda (λ) 18.476043°N 77.372303°E	Scouting, keeping ahead of Perseverance in the canyon and photographing the Southern wall of Belva Crater, again narrowly missing the main area of interest by a few degrees outside the field of view. It snapped the highest suborbital picture taken of the Martian surface since landing.
50	April 13, 2023 at 19:21 (Sol 763)	145.65	18 m (59 ft)	304.761 m (999.87 ft) (with directional changes)	4.6 m/s (10 mph)	Shift northwest, then sharp turn to southeast and land at Airfield Mu (μ) 18.479968°N 77.368802°E	After the previous flight, a communications blackout with Ingenuity occurred due to terrain between it and the rover blocking radio signals until April 11 (Sol 761), when the rover came within range. Also, the base station antenna on the rover is located on the right side and is low enough for various parts of the rover to occlude radio transmission. The 50th flight maintained altitude of 12 m (39 ft) until a "pop up" to a new record height of 18 m (59 ft) before landing. Photography by Perseverance from only 23 m (75 ft) away, its closest approach in two years, showed dust build-up on the helicopter rotor blades and solar panel. After flight 50; compare with image at top, before first flight.
51	April 23, 2023 at 01:34 (Sol 772)	136.9	12 m (39 ft)	190.701 m (625.66 ft) (with directional changes)	4 m/s (8.9 mph)	Shift south, then northwest, then southwest then again northwest, then again southwest and finally south to Airfield Nu (ν) 18.480068°N 77.366480°E	Scouting, helping to identify locations of interest for the Perseverance.
52	April 27, 2023 at 04:11 (Sol 776)	138.88	12 m (39 ft)	363.176 m (1,191.52 ft) (with directional changes)	3.7 m/s (8.3 mph)	Shift west, then sharp turn to southeast and land at Airfield Xi (ξ) 18.480457°N 77.360135°E	Scouting, helping to identify locations of interest for Perseverance. The flight succeeded on the scheduled date, but images and other confirming data were finally received on June 28, 2023 (Sol 837). The rover and helicopter were out of communication with each other for 63 days, because a hill stood between them, blocking radio signals.
53	July 22, 2023 at 11:14 (Sol 860)	74.85	5 m (16 ft)	142.618 m (467.91 ft)	2.5 m/s (5.6 mph)	Shift west to Airfield Omicron (ο) 18.482857°N 77.360133°E	Scouting flight for Perseverance to the north. The low level (5 m or 16 ft) flight intended to create a detailed terrain record was cut short by an automatic contingency landing instruction via a program called ‘LAND_NOW’, prior to the intended ascent to 10 m (33 ft) to assess landing hazards. This is the first inflight abort of the rotorcraft. Investigation revealed, they started to experience the same flight 6 issue, i.e., a glitch occurred in the navigation images processing system.
54	August 4, 2023 at 20:03 (Sol 873)	24.37	5 m (16 ft)	0.026 m (0.085 ft)	0 m/s (0 mph)	Pop-up, landing back on Airfield Omicron (ο) 18.482857°N 77.360133°E	Following an investigation of flight 53's truncated flight plan, this pop-up ascent was designed to test software modifications and confirm the reasons for the autoland instruction on flight 53.
55	August 12, 2023 at 23:09 (Sol 881)	142.9	10 m (33 ft)	265.405 m (870.75 ft) (with directional changes)	4.7 m/s (11 mph)	Shift southwest, then southeast and finally northwest to Airfield Pi (π) 18.48172905°N 77.35698062°E	No advice from NASA regarding purpose.
56	August 26, 2023 at 05:40 (Sol 894)	140.9	12 m (39 ft)	435.761 m (1,429.66 ft) (with directional changes)	5.3 m/s (12 mph)	Shift west, then northwest to land at Airfield Rho (ϱ) 18.487966°N 77.350987°E	Reposition.
57	September 3, 2023 at 13:00 (Sol 902)	128.6	10 m (33 ft)	222.607 m (730.34 ft) (with directional changes)	3 m/s (6.7 mph)	Hover, shift north, then sharp turn southeast to land within Airfield Rho (ϱ) 18.487966°N 77.350987°E	Photograph science targets.
58	September 11, 2023 at 16:27 (Sol 910)	106.8	10 m (33 ft)	175.597 m (576.11 ft)	3 m/s (6.7 mph)	Shift northwest to Airfield Sigma (σ) 18.489411°N 77.348341°E	Reposition, scout the margin carbonate unit for Perseverance
59	September 16, 2023 at 19:32 (Sol 915)	142.6	20 m (66 ft)	1.138 m (3.73 ft)	0 m/s (0 mph)	Pop-up, remain at Airfield Sigma (σ) 18.489398°N 77.348344°E	Pop-up flight; new record altitude.
60	September 26, 2023 at 01:28 (Sol 924)	132.8	16 m (52 ft)	353.345 m (1,159.27 ft) (with directional changes)	8 m/s (18 mph)	Shift northwest, then sharp turn southwest to land at Airfield Tau (τ) 18.493917°N 77.345111°E	Reposition helicopter and photograph science targets.
61	October 5, 2023 at 08:26 (Sol 933)	129.5	24 m (79 ft)	0.341 m (1.12 ft)	0 m/s (0 mph)	Pop-up, remaining at Airfield Tau (τ) 18.493916°N 77.345112°E	Expansion of flight envelope; pop-up flight; new record altitude.
62	October 12, 2023 at 11:18 (Sol 940)	121.07	18 m (59 ft)	291.691 m (956.99 ft) (Roundtrip)	10 m/s (22 mph)	Shift northwest ~130 m (430 ft), then north, then southeast, then southwest, landing again within Airfield Tau (τ). 18.494364°N 77.344844°E	Expansion of flight envelope; new record groundspeed.
63	October 19, 2023 at 16:08 (Sol 947)	142.6	12 m (39 ft)	591.457 m (1,940.48 ft)	6.30 m/s (14.1 mph)	Shift southwest to Airfield Upsilon (υ). 18.488803°N 77.336503°E	Reposition
64	October 27, 2023 at 21:02 (Sol 955)	139.1	12 m (39 ft)	411 m (1,348 ft)	5.80 m/s (13.0 mph)	Shift north to Airfield Phi (φ) 18.494827°N 77.333731°E	Reposition
65	November 2, 2023 (time unconfirmed) (Sol 960)	48	10 m (33 ft)	7 m (23 ft)	1 m/s (2.2 mph)	Minor shift west, remaining within Airfield Phi (φ) 18.494827°N 77.333731°E	Reposition.
66	November 3, 2023 at 01:18 (Sol 961)	23	3 m (9.8 ft)	0.57 m (1 ft 10 in)	1 m/s (2.2 mph)	South, remaining within Airfield Phi (φ) 18.494813°N 77.333653°E	Reposition.
67	Between November 11 (Sol 969) and 25, 2023 (Sol 983)	Solar conjunction, when Mars is behind the Sun, interrupts communications between NASA and Ingenuity. During the pause, Ingenuity was programmed to take color photos to study the movement of sand, which can be a threat to rovers.					
67	December 2, 2023 at 20:14 (Sol 990)	135.9	12 m (39 ft)	399.06 m (1,309.3 ft)	5.30 m/s (11.9 mph)	Shift northwest to Airfield Chi (χ) 18.497426°N 77.327111°E	Reposition.
68	December 15, 2023 (time unconfirmed) (Sol 1002)	131.1	16 m (52 ft)	702.28 m (2,304.1 ft) (Roundtrip)	10 m/s (22 mph)	Excursion northeast ~414 m (1,358 ft) returning to Airfield Chi (χ) 18.497426°N 77.327111°E	Flight test.
69	December 20, 2023 at 07:20 (Sol 1007)	135.4	16 m (52 ft)	702.27 m (2,304.0 ft) (Roundtrip)	10 m/s (22 mph)	Excursion northeast ~414 m (1,358 ft), returning to Airfield Chi (χ) 18.497426°N 77.327111°E	Flight test.
70	December 22, 2023 at 08:39 (Sol 1009)	132.9	12 m (39 ft)	255.109 m (836.97 ft)	3 m/s (6.7 mph)	Shift northwest, then southwest, returning to Airfield Chi (χ) 18.496747°N 77.323738°E	Reposition.
71	January 6, 2024 (time unconfirmed) (Sol 1023)	34.96	12 m (39 ft)	67.936 m (222.89 ft)	7 m/s (16 mph)	Shift westwards, returning to Airfield Chi (χ) 18.497253°N 77.322722°E	The planned flight was terminated early for technical reasons.
72	January 18, 2024 (time unconfirmed) (Sol 1035)	32.2	12 m (39 ft)	10.303 m (33.80 ft)	0 m/s (0 mph)	Pop-up, returning to Airfield Chi (χ) 18.497263°N 77.322539°E	Ingenuity was permanently grounded following this flight, a brief ascent to check the helicopter's systems after the previous flight's unplanned termination. Data sent via Perseverance indicated that the helicopter successfully climbed to its assigned altitude, but lost communication with Perseverance before landing because the vehicles were positioned out of line-of-sight, blocking radio signals, as had happened on previous occasions. Communication was re-established on January 20, and during the post-flight assessment, images of the rotor blade shadows taken by the onboard cameras after the flight showed damage to the blades, making the helicopter unfit to fly. On January 25, 2024, NASA Administrator, Bill Nelson, announced the end of the mission. Engineers determined that Ingenuity’s navigation system could not provide accurate data during the flight over the location's featureless terrain, resulting in an off-balance hard landing that broke the blades. The helicopter's final location is at Airfield Chi (χ) within the area since nicknamed by the project team Valinor Hills, a reference to the final residence of the immortals in the J.R.R. Tolkien trilogy, The Lord of the Rings. Image by Ingenuity after flight 72 of rotor blade shadow, showing damage.

== Flight totals at end of mission ==
Number of flights	Distance flown	Time flown
72	17.242 km (10.714 mi)	128.92 min (2:08:55)
Sols from detachment from rover on mission Sol 43, April 3, 2021, to end of mission: 1,000
Days from detachment from rover on mission Day 44, April 3, 2021, to end of mission: 1,027
Earth years: 2.81 years, or 2 years, 9 months, 3 weeks and 6 days

== Flight records ==
Category	Duration	Altitude	Distance	Max Ground Speed
Value	169.5 s (2 m 49 s)	24 m (79 ft)	708.91 m (2,325.8 ft)	10 m/s (22 mph)
Flight	12	61	25	62

== Flight path ==
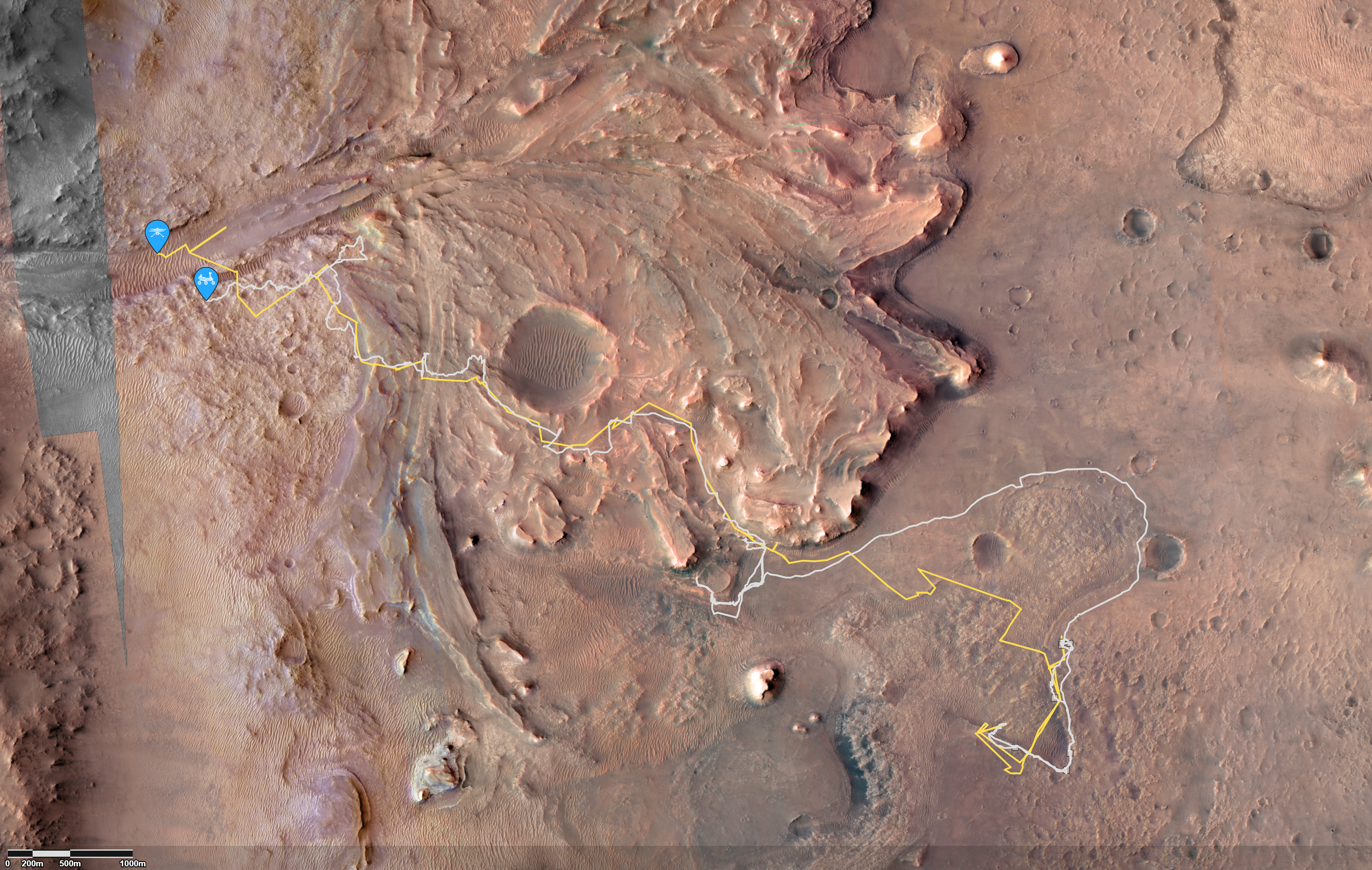
Ingenuity total flight path at end of mission, also showing Perseverance's track up to that point.

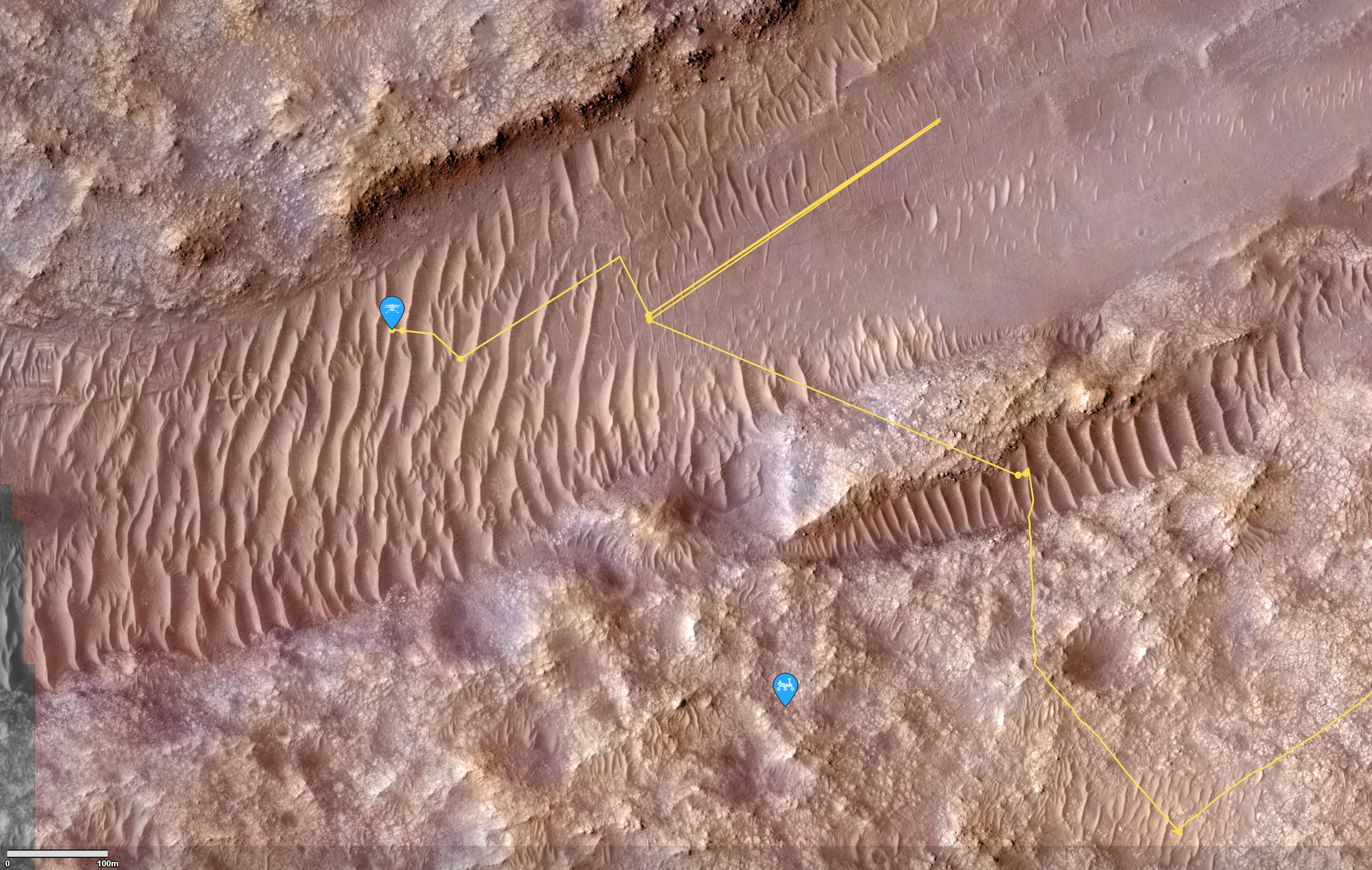
Detail of end of mission location at Airfield Chi (χ), in the dunes of Valinor Hills.

== See also ==
- ARES – 2008 robotic Mars aircraft proposal
- Atmosphere of Mars
- Dragonfly – Robotic rotorcraft mission to Saturn's moon Titan, planned launch in 2028
- Exploration of Mars
- List of artificial objects on Mars
- List of firsts in aviation
