= Bethany Ehlmann =

American planetary scientist

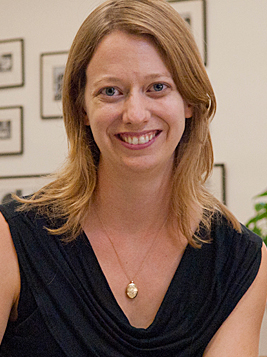
- Born: California, U.S.
- Education: Washington University in St. Louis, AB, 2004, DSc, 2024; University of Oxford, MSc, 2005 & 2007; Brown University, M.S., 2008, PhD, 2010
- Awards: Rhodes Scholarship, National Geographic Society Emerging Explorer, Harold C. Urey Prize
- Scientific career
- Fields: Planetary Science
- Workplaces: University of Colorado Boulder; NASA Jet Propulsion Laboratory; California Institute of Technology
- Thesis: Early Mars Environments Revealed Through Near-Infrared Spectroscopy of Alteration Minerals (2010)
- Doctoral advisor: John F. Mustard
- Website: www.ehlmann.caltech.edu

Bethany List Ehlmann is an American planetary scientist, geologist, and professor. She is the Director of the Laboratory for Atmospheric and Space Physics at the University of Colorado Boulder.

Ehlmann has three Master's degrees, a Doctor of Philosophy, and an honorary Doctor of Science. From 2011 until mid-2025, Ehlman was a professor of Planetary Science at California Institute of Technology and a Research Scientist at NASA's Jet Propulsion Laboratory.

Ehlmann is also the President of The Planetary Society and the Director of the Keck Institute for Space Studies.

== Education and early life ==
Ehlmann was born in Southern California, where her father, Bryon Ehlmann, was an assistant professor of computer science at Chapman University. The family then relocated to Tallahassee, Florida, where Bryon was a professor at Florida A&M University and Florida State University. Ehlmann graduated from James S. Rickards High School with an International Baccalaureate Diploma in 2000, where she was awarded the Fred Biletnikoff Award. They then relocated to Edwardsville, Illinois, near Bryon's hometown of St. Charles, Missouri, where he was a professor at Southern Illinois University Edwardsville.

Ehlmann studied at Washington University in St. Louis, double majoring in earth and planetary sciences and environmental studies; and minoring in mathematics. During all four years of her undergraduate studies, she was an Arthur Compton Scholar. In 2001, she won the Varney Prize in Undergraduate Physics and the Fossett Fellowship for the Pathfinder Program in environmental studies. From 2002-2003, she was awarded the Barry M. Goldwater Scholarship and the Morris K. Udall Fellowship. She worked with Professor Raymond Arvidson on operations of the Spirit and Opportunity Mars Exploration rovers at JPL for their first 9 months of operations and with a student group from the NASA Ames Astrobiology Academy on a publication describing the benefits of human exploration of Mars. She graduated with a Bachelor of Arts and Science in 2004.

She then attended the University of Oxford as a Rhodes Scholar beginning in 2004. There, she received two Master of Science degrees, one in Environmental Change and Management under the mentorship of John Boardman, awarded in 2005, and the other in Geography under the mentorship of Heather Viles, awarded in 2007. While at Oxford, she contributed to the analysis of remote sensing data to help evaluate safe landing sites for the Mars Exploration Rover in a 2005 study. Her Geography thesis was entitled "Developing quantitative techniques for evaluating rock breakdown morphology: a case study of basalt boulders in the Channelled Scablands, Washington, USA."

Ehlmann then returned to the United States to attend Brown University for a Master of Science degree and a Doctor of Philosophy (PhD) in Geological Sciences in the research group of John F. Mustard. During her doctoral career, her focus shifted to studying Mars, utilizing orbital spectral data from the Compact Reconnaissance Imaging Spectrometer for Mars (CRISM), a visible-infrared spectrometer aboard the Mars Reconnaissance Orbiter that takes measurements from the surface and atmosphere of Mars. CRISM is used to find the signature spectral signatures of different minerals to understand what minerals are present on Mars and form hypotheses on how different geological processes have shaped the planet over the course of its history. Using CRISM data, Ehlmann became the first to identify carbonate-bearing rocks on Mars, the presence of which suggests that water present on Mars when these rocks formed was neutral to alkaline. She also discovered evidence for the presence of a methane-producing mineral called serpentine on Mars. The discovery could be a clue of past life on Mars, as serpentine arises from a mineral called olivine in a hydrothermal process that could serve as an energy source for methane-producing microbes. Her dissertation, published in 2010 and entitled "Early Mars Environments Revealed Through Near-Infrared Spectroscopy of Alteration Minerals," documented her investigation of aqueous processes that occurred on ancient Mars during the earliest epoch of Martian history: the Noachian (>3.7 Ga). The work was aimed, in part, at better understanding the changing habitability of Mars over time, as well as understanding how aqueous environments have evolved on Mars. Her dissertation received Brown University's Joukowsky award for the outstanding PhD dissertation.

In 2024, Ehlmann received an honorary Doctor of Science from Washington University.

== Research and post-doctoral career ==
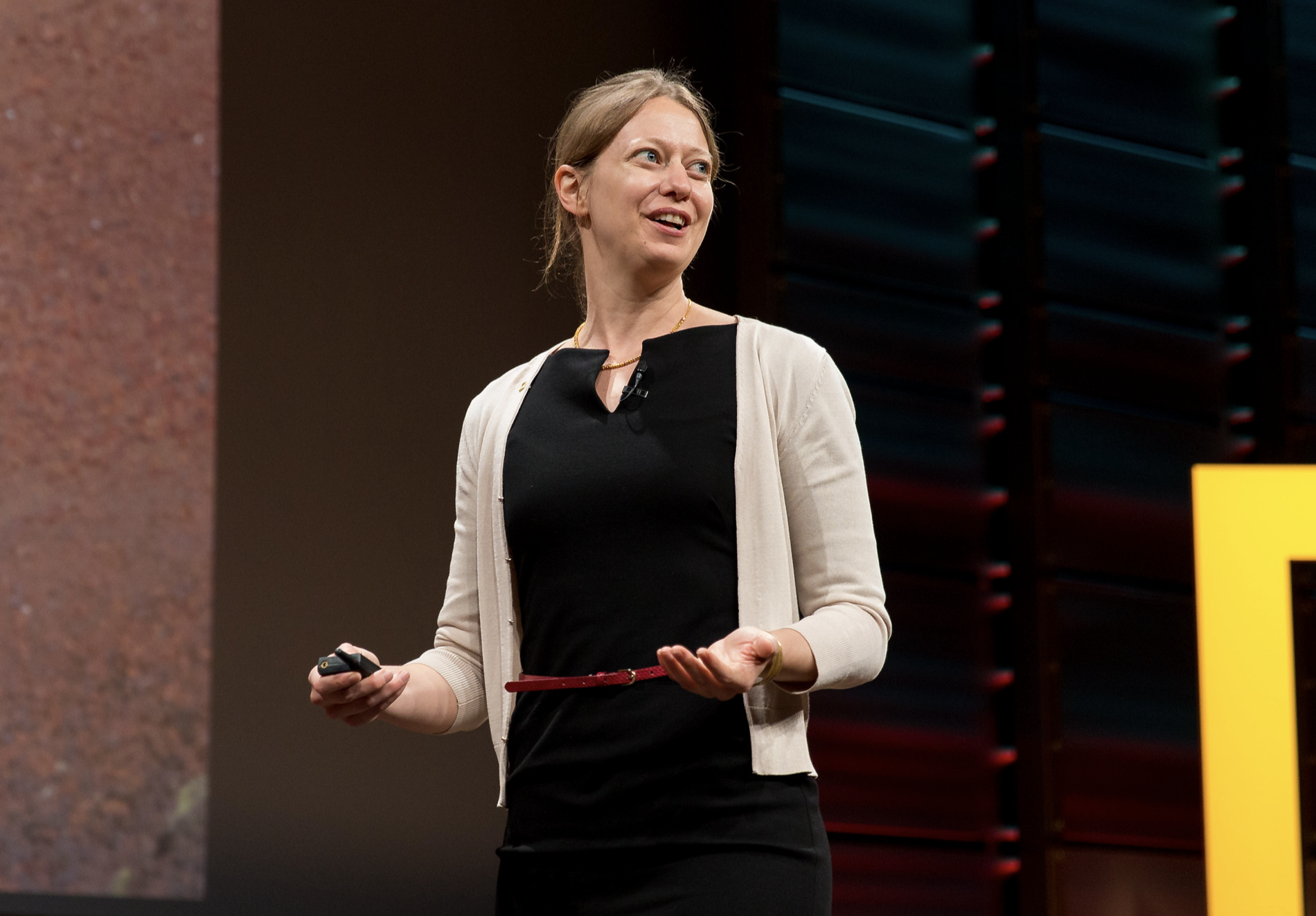
Bethany Ehlmann in 2018

Following her doctorate, Ehlmann became a European Union Marie Curie Fellow at the Institut d’Astrophysique Spatiale at University of Paris-Sud.

In 2011, Ehlmann became an assistant professor of Planetary Science at California Institute of Technology and a Research Scientist at the Jet Propulsion Laboratory, continuing her research in the mineral composition and chemistry of different planets, with a focus on Earth and Mars. In 2017, she was promoted to tenured professor. She's particularly interested in tracing chemical processes of water on other planets.

For instance, her group has helped contribute to our understanding of Mars' missing atmosphere. A previous hypothesis suggested that carbon from Mars originally thick atmosphere had been sequestered into carbonate rocks and minerals. Ehlmann's team, however, inventoried evidence for carbonate rocks on the planet by analyzing satellite data and found there were not enough carbonate rocks on the planet to support that hypothesis. They suggested instead that the atmosphere had been gradually lost in space, which is supported by evidence collected by the Curiosity rover. By contrast, her group demonstrated the important role of sequestration of large volumes of water in Mars' crust as hydrated minerals. Along with the long-recognized process of loss to space, this drove climate change and aridification.

Ehlmann has also collaborated on mission development and mission operations for NASA, including the Mars Science Laboratory's Curiosity rover and developing the Mastcam-Z and the Scanning Habitable Environments with Raman and Luminescence for Organics and Chemicals (SHERLOC) imaging instruments for the Mars 2020 rover. Using samples collected by the Mars Curiosity rover, Ehlmann and her colleagues have planned experiments to interpret the sandstone layers of dunes that have since turned into rock on the Martian surface to search for clues of life on Mars, as well as how Mars' environment has evolved over the years. She was part of the team that proposed the Jezero crater, where rivers once fed into a lake, as the landing site for the Mars 2020 mission, citing that the crater was also an excellent landing site to look for signs of life underground, collecting river and lake sediments that might retain signs of past life. She is also one of several scientists advocating that the 2020 mission be a "mega mission" to find ancient life on Mars, visiting the maximum number of sites possible to ensure the likelihood that samples with signs of life are collected.

Ehlmann is also part of the team exploring the geology of Ceres with data collected by the Dawn spacecraft. Ceres is the largest asteroid and dwarf planet in the Solar System's main asteroid belt and is marked by a number of bright spots associated with the impact of the crater Occator. She and collaborators found the bright spots were due to a variety of highly reflective salts that have accumulated on Ceres, likely as a result of some water-related process.

Ehlmann was Principal Investigator of Lunar Trailblazer, a mission to study water on the Moon and one of the first missions in a new class of low-cost small spacecraft for planetary science. In June 2019, Lunar Trailblazer (LTB) was selected as a finalist for NASA's Small Innovative Missions for Planetary Science call. It was confirmed as a flight mission in November 2020. The smallsat launched successfully on February 26, 2025, from Kennedy Space Center Launch Complex 39, as part of NASA's Commercial Lunar Payload Services with Intuitive Machines IM-2 mission. Neither mission was successful and NASA lost contact with LTB a day after its launch. NASA attempted to regain contact with the orbiter until it the mission was shut down in July 2025 after it drifted into deep space.

In April 2025, Ehlmann was the first woman to be named as the Director of University of Colorado Boulder's Laboratory for Atmospheric and Space Physics.

== Public service ==
In 2016, Ehlmann was appointed to the National Academy of Sciences advisory Committee on Astrobiology and Planetary Science. In 2020, she began service on the National Academies Planetary Science and Astrobiology Decadal Survey 2023-2032 as a member of the Steering Committee and vice-chair of the Mars Panel.

In 2019, Ehlmann joined the Board of Directors of The Planetary Society. In 2020, Ehlman was appointed as the President.

Ehlmann is also active in STEM public outreach. In 2018 she published a children's book with the National Geographic Society's National Geographic Kids "Dr. E's Super-Stellar Solar System", pairing graphic novel-style adventures in the Solar System with Solar System facts from space missions, field studies, and telescope observations for children aged 8–12.

As of 2024, Ehlmann is the Director of the Keck Institute for Space Studies.

== Awards and honors ==
- Arthur Compton Scholar, 2001, 2002, 2003, 2004
- Varney Prize in Undergraduate Physics, 2001
- Fossett Fellowship for the Pathfinder Program in environmental studies, 2001
- Barry Goldwater Scholar, 2002
- Morris K. Udall Scholar, 2002, 2003
- Rhodes Scholar, 2004
- Emerging Explorer, National Geographic Society, 2013
- James B. Macelwane Medal, American Geophysical Union, 2015
- Kavli Fellow, National Academy of Sciences, 2015
- Harold C. Urey Prize in Planetary Science, 2017
- Fellow of the Mineralogical Society of America, 2023
- Elected to the National Academy of Science, 2026
