= Thomas Prince =

Thomas Prince may refer to:

- Thomas Prince (historian) (1687–1758), American clergyman, scholar and historian
- Thomas Prince (Leveller) (fl. 1630–1657)
- Thomas Prince (footballer) (1879–1950), English footballer
- Thomas Prince (mayor) (born c.1990), Mayor of Greater Bendigo
- Thomas Binkley Prince (1913–1969), creator of the Arizona roadside attraction The Thing?
- Thomas Prince (scientist), professor of physics at the California Institute of Technology
- Tommy Prince (Thomas George Prince 1915–1977), Indigenous Canadian war hero
- Tom Prince (baseball) (Thomas Albert Prince, born 1964), American baseball player
- Tom Prince (bodybuilder) (1969–2022), American professional bodybuilder
