= Mike Malin =

Mike Malin may refer to:

- Michael C. Malin (born 1950), planetary geologist
- Mike "Boogie" Malin (born 1970), Big Brother houseguest and winner
