= Mars Climate Orbiter =

Failed NASA mission to Mars (1998–1999)

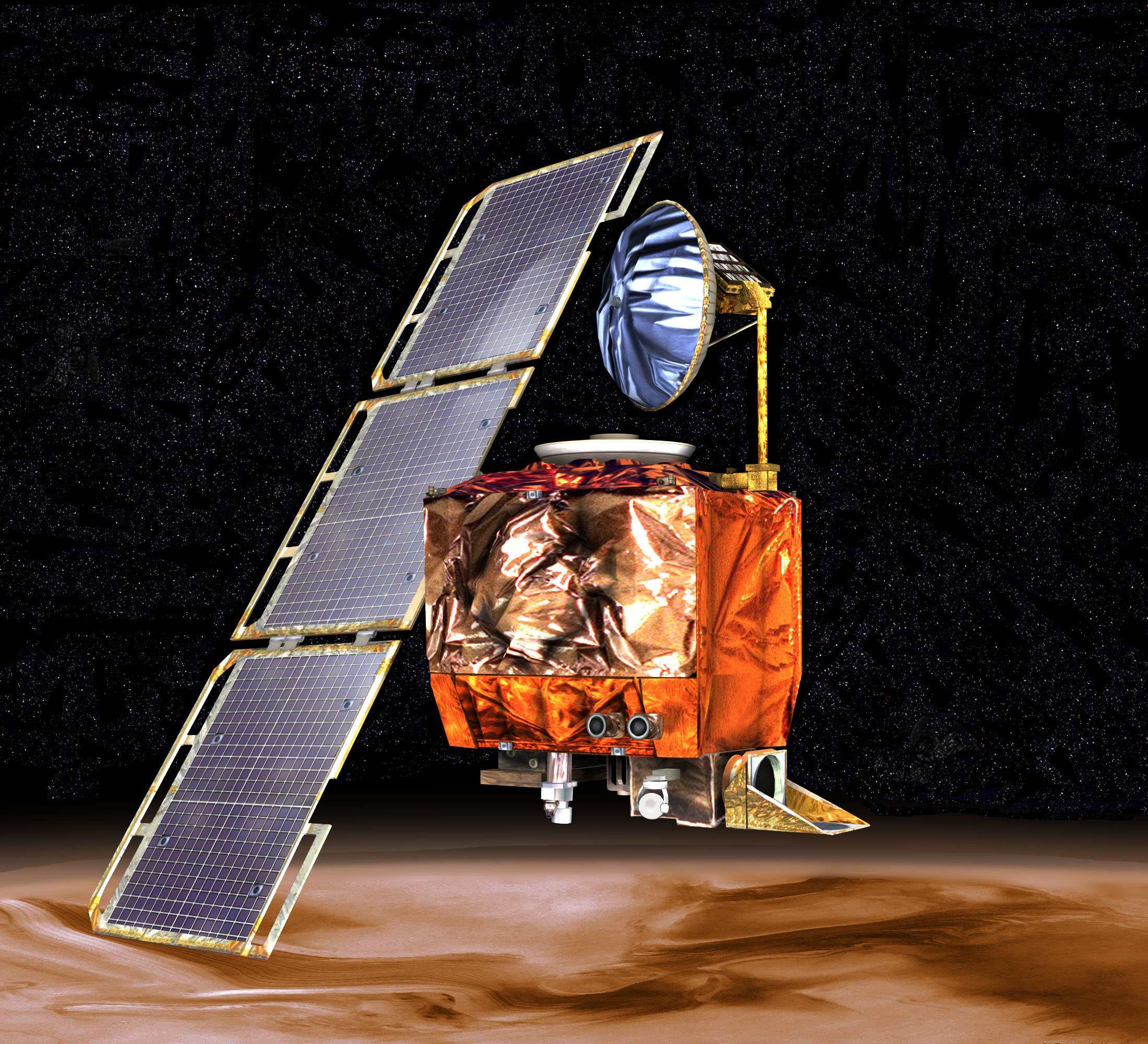
- Artist's conception of the Mars Climate Orbiter
- Names: Mars Surveyor '98 Orbiter
- Mission type: Mars orbiter
- Operator: NASA/JPL
- COSPAR ID: 1998-073A
- SATCAT no.: 25571
- Website: science.nasa.gov
- Mission duration: 286 days Mission failure

Spacecraft properties
- Manufacturer: Lockheed Martin
- Launch mass: 638 kg (1,407 lb)
- Power: 500 watts

Start of mission
- Launch date: December 11, 1998, 18:45:51 UTC
- Rocket: Delta II 7425; D-264
- Launch site: CCAFS SLC-17A
- Contractor: Boeing

End of mission
- Disposal: Destroyed
- Last contact: 23 September 1999 09:06:00 UTC; Unintentionally deorbited

Orbital parameters
- Reference system: Areocentric
- Epoch: Planned
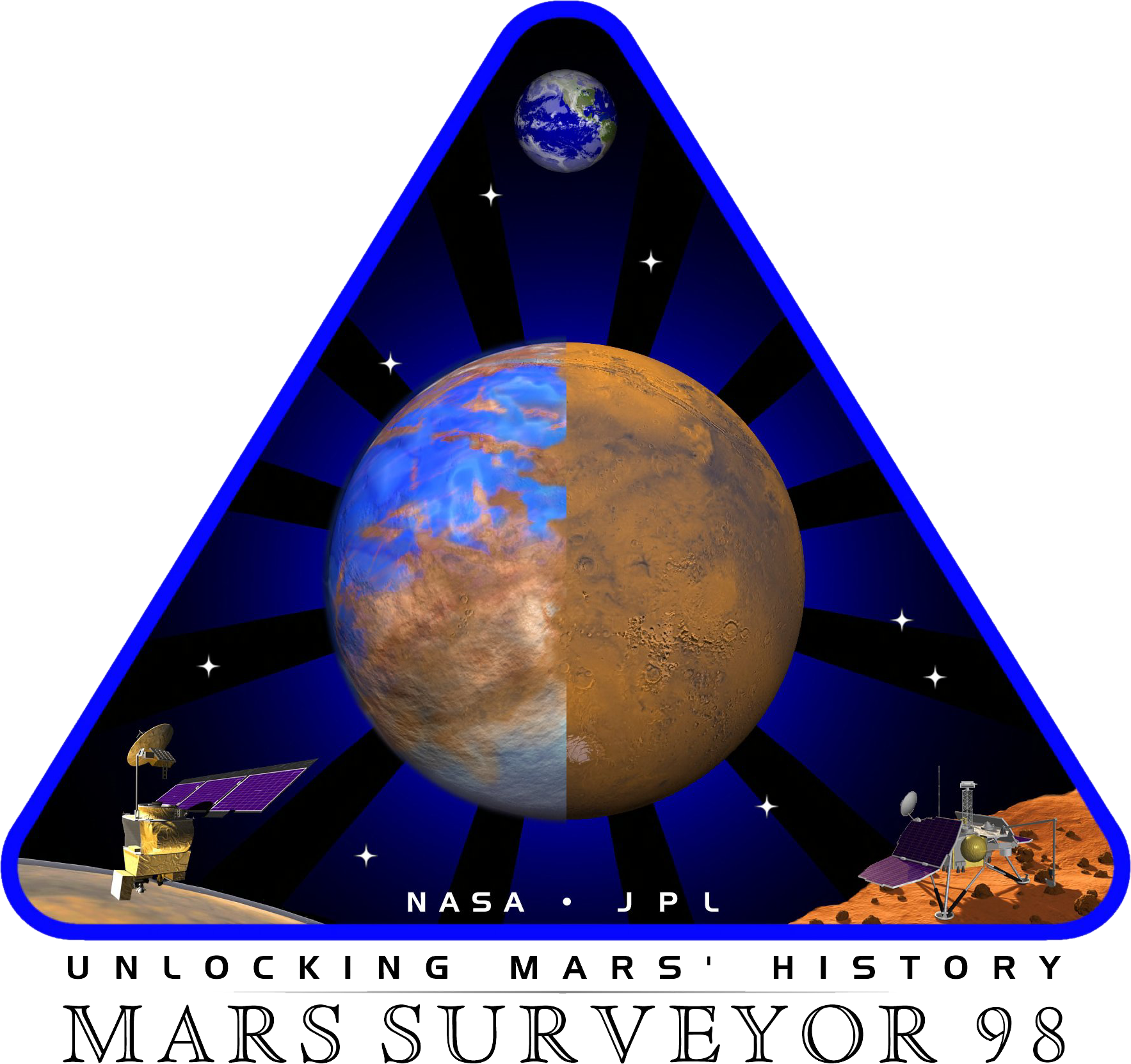
- Mars Surveyor 98 mission logo Mars Exploration Program Mars Surveyor '98

The Mars Climate Orbiter (formerly the Mars Surveyor '98 Orbiter) was a robotic space probe launched by NASA on December 11, 1998, to study the Martian climate, Martian atmosphere, and surface changes and to act as the communications relay in the Mars Surveyor '98 program for Mars Polar Lander. However, on September 23, 1999, communication with the spacecraft was permanently lost as it went into orbital insertion. The spacecraft encountered Mars on a trajectory that brought it too close to the planet, and it was destroyed in the atmosphere. An investigation attributed the failure to a measurement mismatch between two measurement systems: SI units (metric) by NASA and US customary units by spacecraft builder Lockheed Martin.

== Mission background ==
=== History ===
After the loss of Mars Observer and the onset of the rising costs associated with the future International Space Station, NASA began seeking less expensive, smaller probes for scientific interplanetary missions. In 1994, the Panel on Small Spacecraft Technology was established to set guidelines for future miniature spacecraft. The panel determined that the new line of miniature spacecraft should be under 1,000 kg (2,200 lb) with highly focused instrumentation. In 1995, a new Mars Surveyor program began as a set of missions designed with limited objectives, low costs, and frequent launches. The first mission in the new program was Mars Global Surveyor, launched in 1996 to map Mars and provide geologic data using instruments intended for Mars Observer. Following Mars Global Surveyor, Mars Climate Orbiter carried two instruments, one originally intended for Mars Observer, to study the climate and weather of Mars.

The primary science objectives of the mission included:

- Determine the distribution of water on Mars
- Monitor the daily weather and atmospheric conditions
- Record changes on the Martian surface due to wind and other atmospheric effects
- Determine temperature profiles of the atmosphere
- Monitor the water vapor and dust content of the atmosphere
- Look for evidence of past climate change.

=== Spacecraft design ===
The Mars Climate Orbiter bus measured 2.1 m (6 ft 11 in) tall, 1.6 m (5 ft 3 in) wide and 2.0 m (6 ft 7 in) deep. The internal structure was largely constructed with graphite composite/aluminum honeycomb supports, a design found in many commercial airplanes. With the exception of the scientific instruments, battery and main engine, the spacecraft included dual redundancy on the most important systems. The spacecraft weighed 638 kg (1,407 lb).

The spacecraft was three-axis stabilized and included eight hydrazine monopropellant thrusters: four 22 N (4.9 lb_{f}) thrusters to perform trajectory corrections and four 0.9 N (3.2 ozf) thrusters to control attitude. Orientation of the spacecraft was determined by a star tracker, two Sun sensors and two inertial measurement units. Orientation was controlled by firing the thrusters or using three reaction wheels. To perform the Mars orbital insertion maneuver, the spacecraft also included a LEROS 1B main engine rocket, providing 640 N (140 lb_{f}) of thrust by burning hydrazine fuel with nitrogen tetroxide (NTO) oxidizer.

The spacecraft included a 1.3 m (4 ft 3 in) high-gain antenna to transceive data with the Deep Space Network over the x band. The radio transponder designed for the Cassini–Huygens mission was used as a cost-saving measure. It also included a two-way UHF radio frequency system to relay communications with Mars Polar Lander upon an expected landing on December 3, 1999.

The space probe was powered with a three-panel solar array, providing an average of 500 W at Mars. Deployed, the solar array measured 5.5 m (18 ft 1 in) in length. Power was stored in 12-cell, 16-amp-hour nickel-hydrogen batteries. The batteries were intended to be recharged when the solar array received sunlight and power the spacecraft as it passed into the shadow of Mars. When entering into orbit around Mars, the solar array was to be utilized in the aerobraking maneuver, to slow the spacecraft until a circular orbit was achieved. The design was largely adapted from guidelines from the Small Spacecraft Technology Initiative outlined in the book, Technology for Small Spacecraft.

In an effort to simplify previous implementations of computers on spacecraft, Mars Climate Orbiter featured a single computer using an IBM RAD6000 processor implementing the POWER1 ISA, capable of 5, 10 or 20 MHz operation. Data storage was to be maintained on 128 MB of random-access memory (RAM) and 18 MB of flash memory. The flash memory was intended to be used for highly important data, including triplicate copies of the flight system software.

== Scientific instruments ==
=== Pressure Modulated Infrared Radiometer (PMIRR) ===
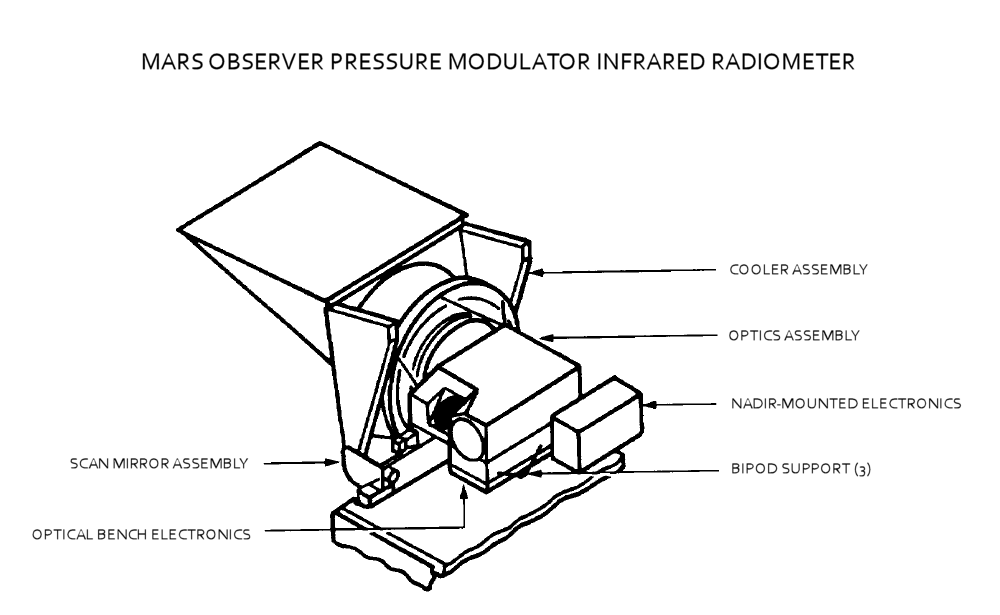
PMIRR diagram

The Pressure Modulated Infrared Radiometer (PMIRR) uses narrow-band radiometric channels and two pressure modulation cells to measure atmospheric and surface emissions in the thermal infrared and a visible channel to measure dust particles and condensates in the atmosphere and on the surface at varying longitudes and seasons. Its principal investigator was Daniel McCleese at JPL/CALTECH. Similar objectives were later achieved with Mars Climate Sounder on board Mars Reconnaissance Orbiter. Its objectives:

- Map the three-dimensional and time-varying thermal structure of the atmosphere from the surface to 80 km altitude.
- Map the atmospheric dust loading and its global, vertical and temporal variation.
- Map the seasonal and spatial variation of the vertical distribution of atmospheric water vapor to an altitude of at least 35 km.
- Distinguish between atmospheric condensates and map their spatial and temporal variation.
- Map the seasonal and spatial variability of atmospheric pressure.
- Monitor the polar radiation balance.

=== Mars Color Imager (MARCI) ===
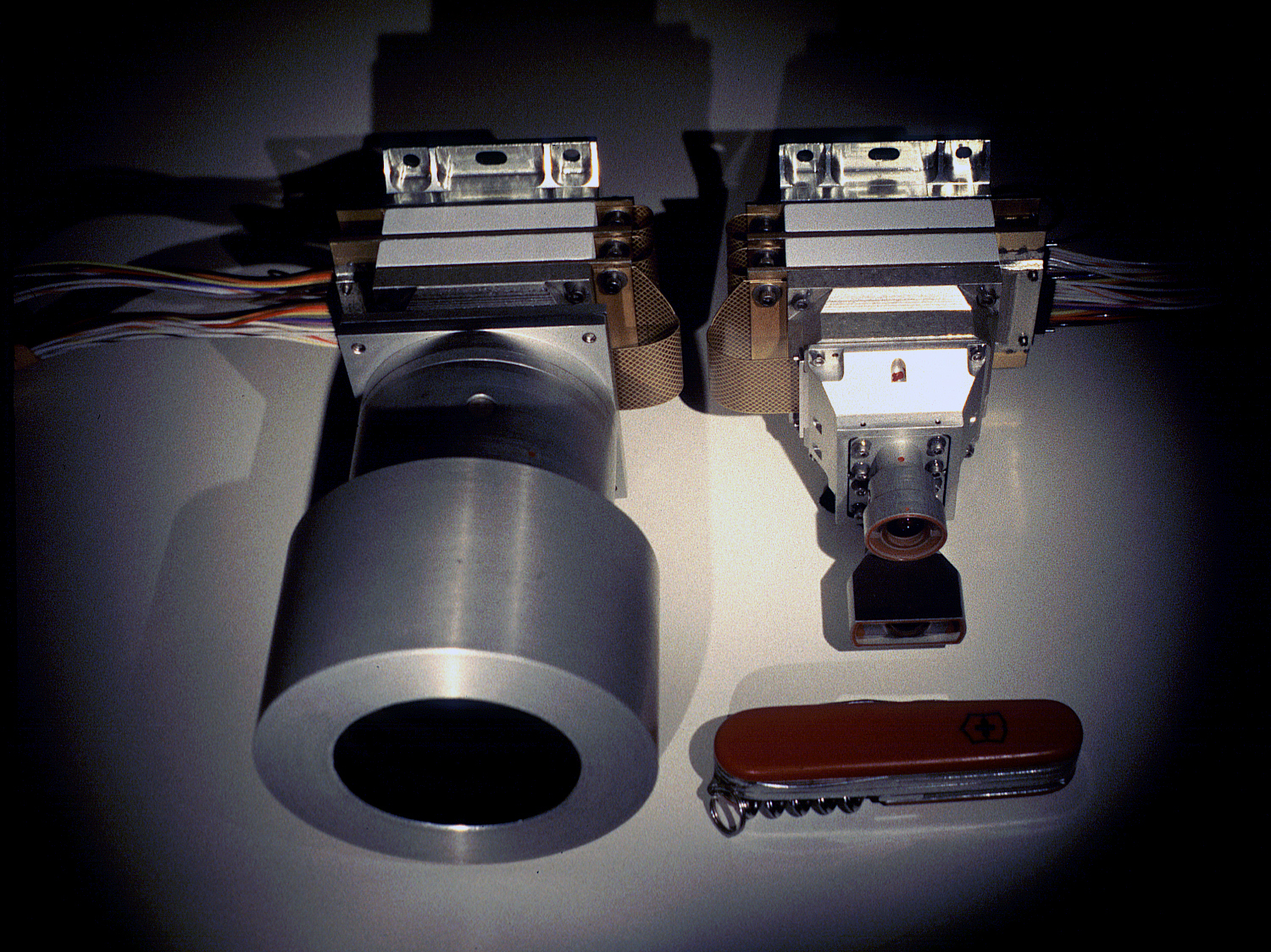
MARCI camera

The Mars Color Imager (MARCI) is a two-camera (medium-angle/wide-angle) imaging system designed to obtain pictures of the Martian surface and atmosphere. Under proper conditions, resolutions up to 1 km (3,300 ft) are possible. The principal investigator on this project was Michael Malin at Malin Space Science Systems and the project was reincorporated on Mars Reconnaissance Orbiter.

Its objectives:

- Observe Martian atmospheric processes at global scale and synoptically.
- Study details of the interaction of the atmosphere with the surface at a variety of scales in both space and time.
- Examine surface features characteristic of the evolution of the Martian climate over time.
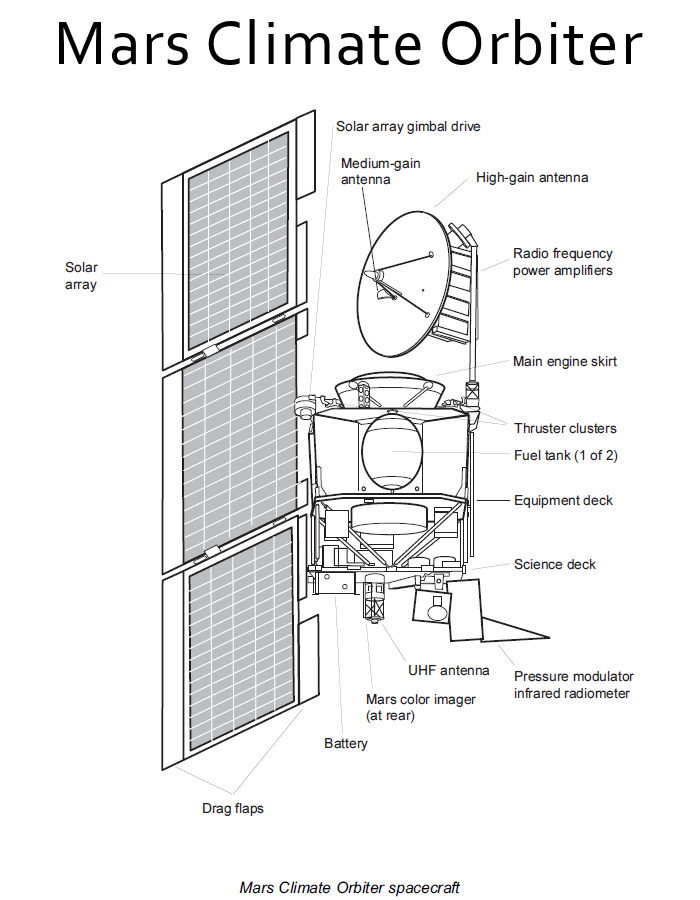
Diagram of Mars Climate Orbiter

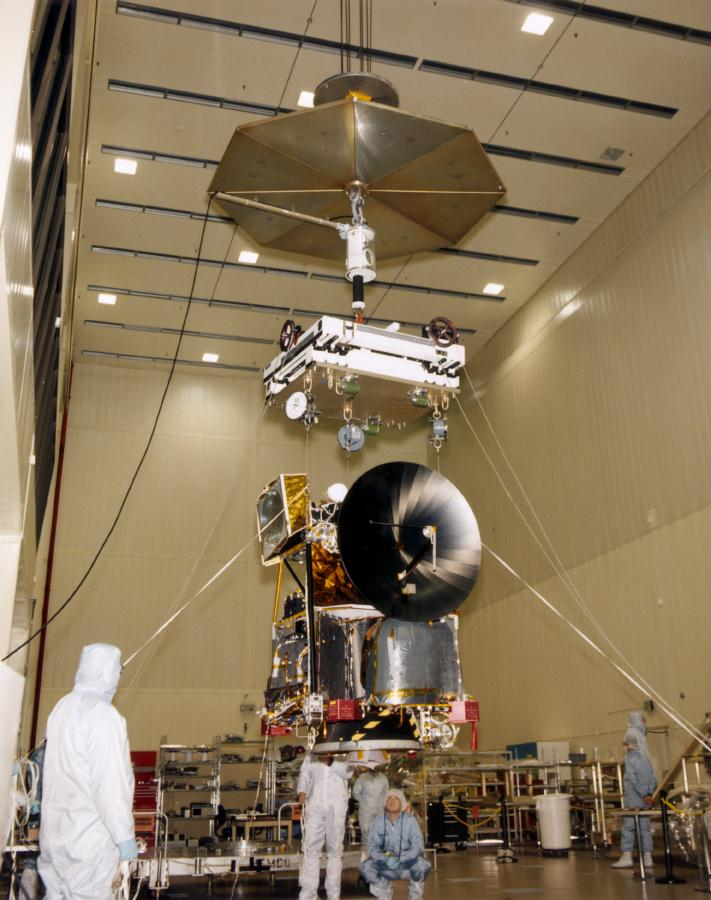
Mars Climate Orbiter during assembly

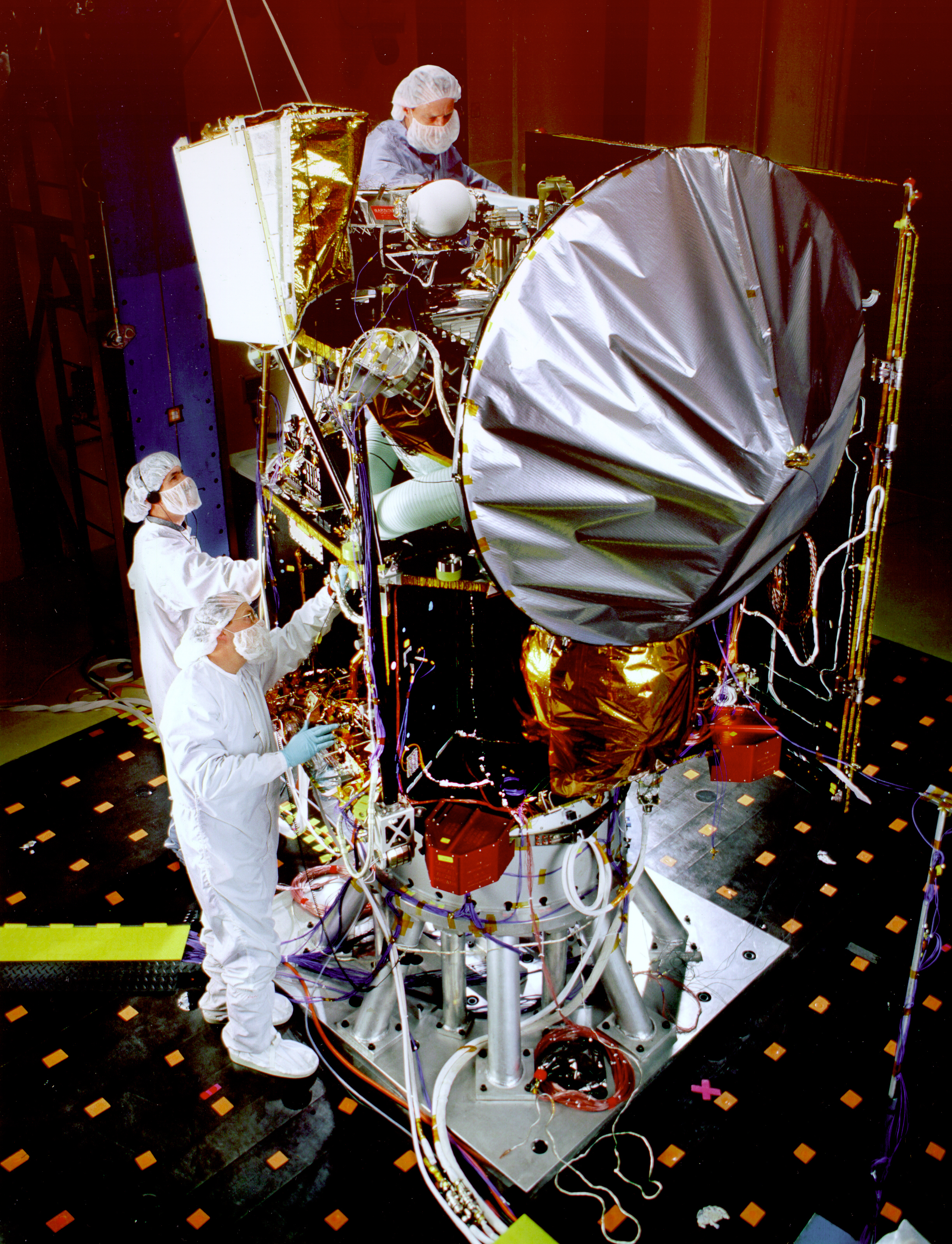
Mars Climate Orbiter undergoing acoustic testing

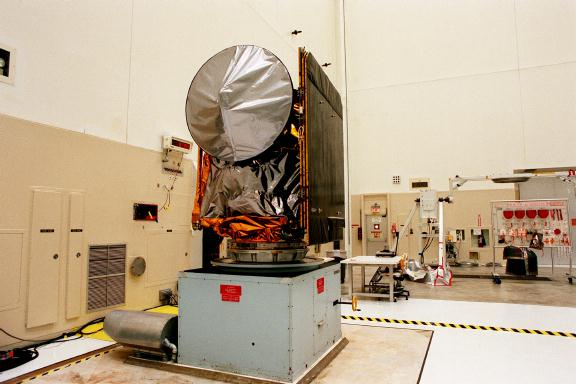
Mars Climate Orbiter awaiting a spin test in November 1998

== Mission profile ==
Timeline of travel
Date	Time (UTC)	Event
Dec 11 1998	18:45:51	Spacecraft launched
Sep 23 1999	08:41:00	Insertion begins. Orbiter stows solar array.
Sep 23 1999	08:50:00	Orbiter turns to correct orientation to begin main engine burn.
Sep 23 1999	08:56:00	Orbiter fires pyrotechnic devices which open valves to begin pressurizing the fuel and oxidizer tanks.
Sep 23 1999	09:00:46	Main engine burn starts; expected to fire for 16 minutes 23 seconds.
Sep 23 1999	09:04:52	Communication with spacecraft lost
Sep 23 1999	09:06:00	Orbiter expected to enter Mars occultation, out of radio contact with Earth. (Note: Planned but unaccounted for event.)
Sep 23 1999	09:27:00	Expected to exit Mars occultation.
Sep 25 1999		Mission declared a loss. Reason for loss known. No further attempts to contact.

=== Launch and trajectory ===
The Mars Climate Orbiter probe was launched on December 11, 1998, at 18:45:51 UTC by NASA from Space Launch Complex 17A at the Cape Canaveral Air Station in Florida, aboard a Delta II 7425 launch vehicle. The complete burn sequence lasted 42 minutes bringing the spacecraft into a Hohmann transfer orbit, sending the probe into a 9.5-month, 669 million km (416 million mi) trajectory. At launch, Mars Climate Orbiter weighed 638 kg (1,407 lb) including propellant.

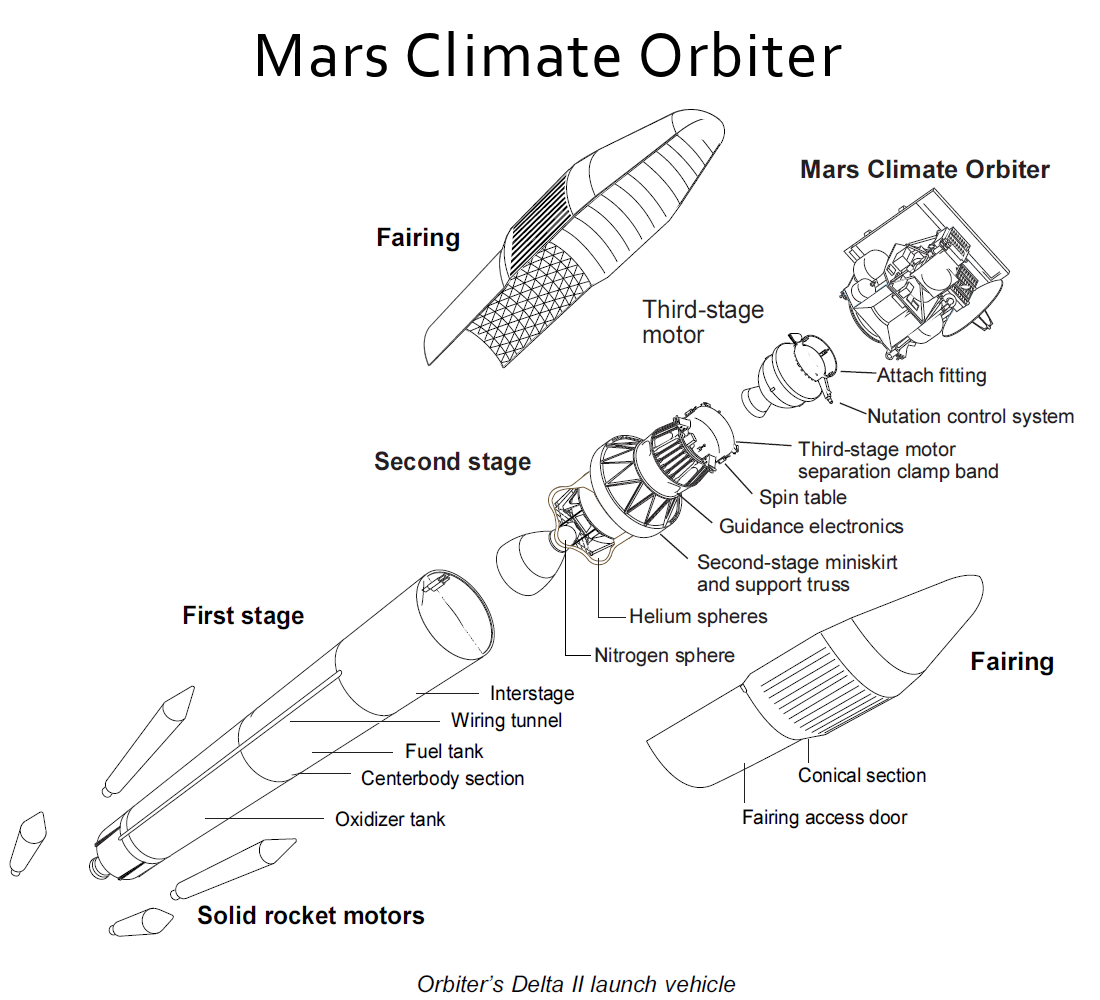
Exploded diagram of Delta II launch vehicle with Mars Climate Orbiter

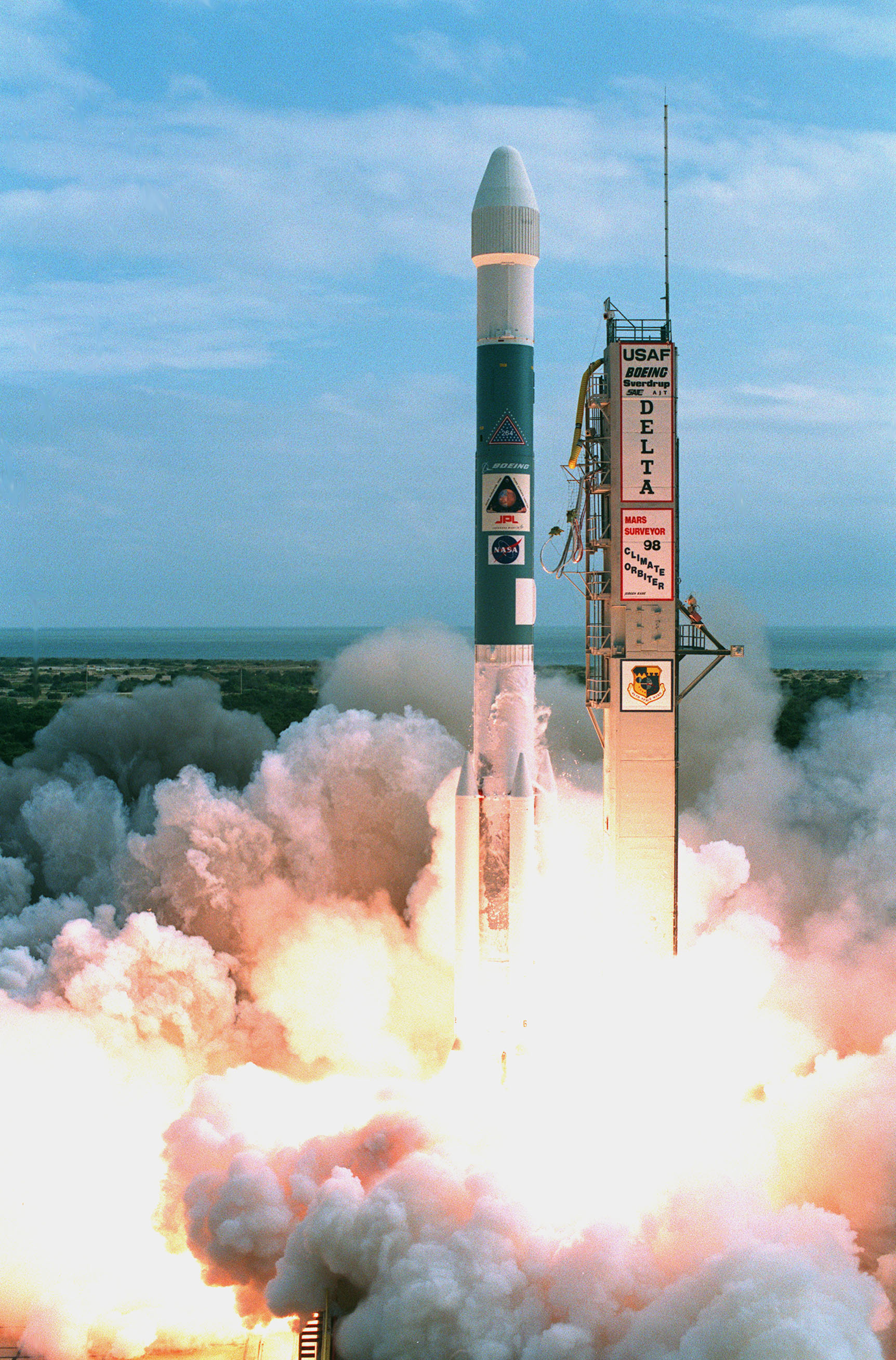
Launch of Mars Climate Orbiter by NASA on a Delta II 7425 launch vehicle

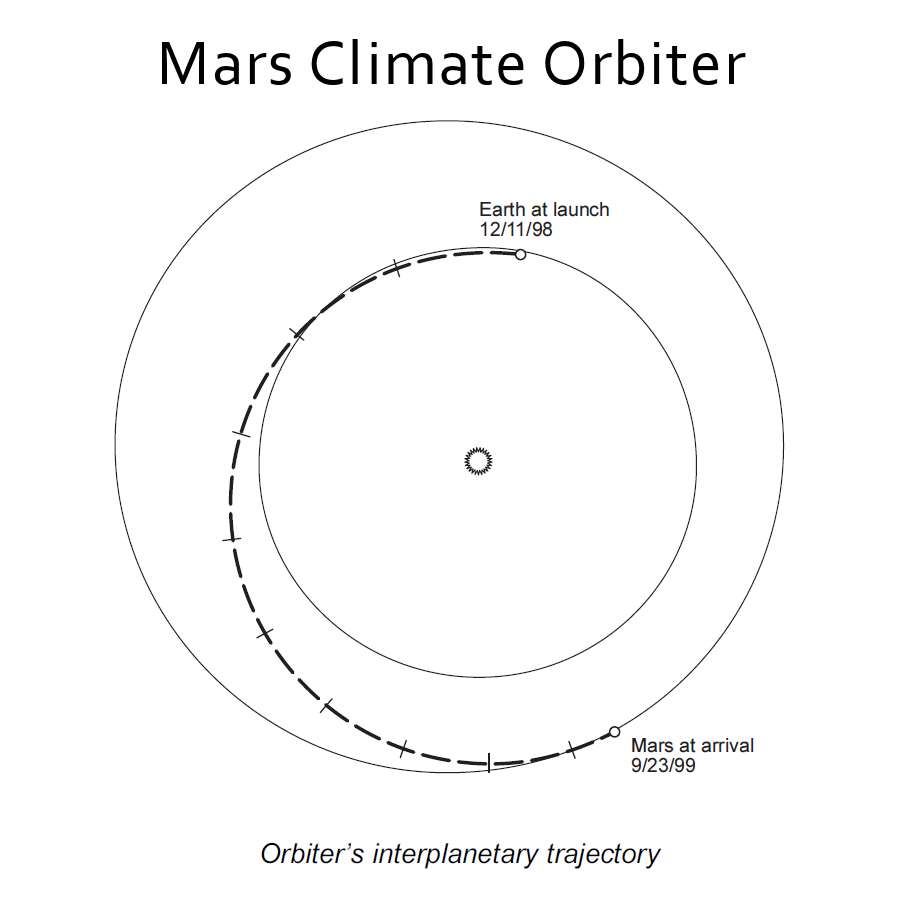
Interplanetary trajectory of Mars Climate Orbiter

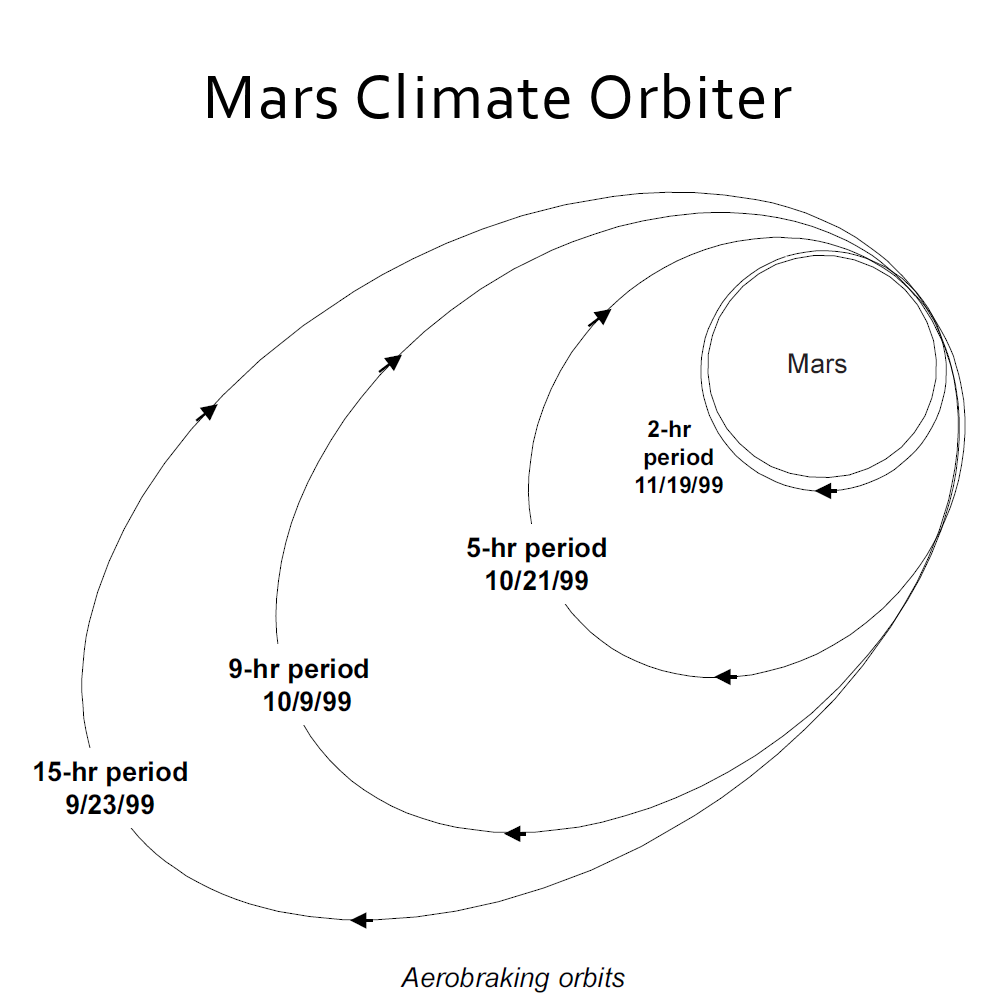
Aerobraking procedure to place Mars Climate Orbiter into orbit around Mars

=== Encounter with Mars ===
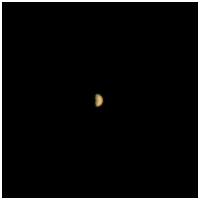
This image of Mars on September 7, 1999, is the only image acquired by the Orbiter.

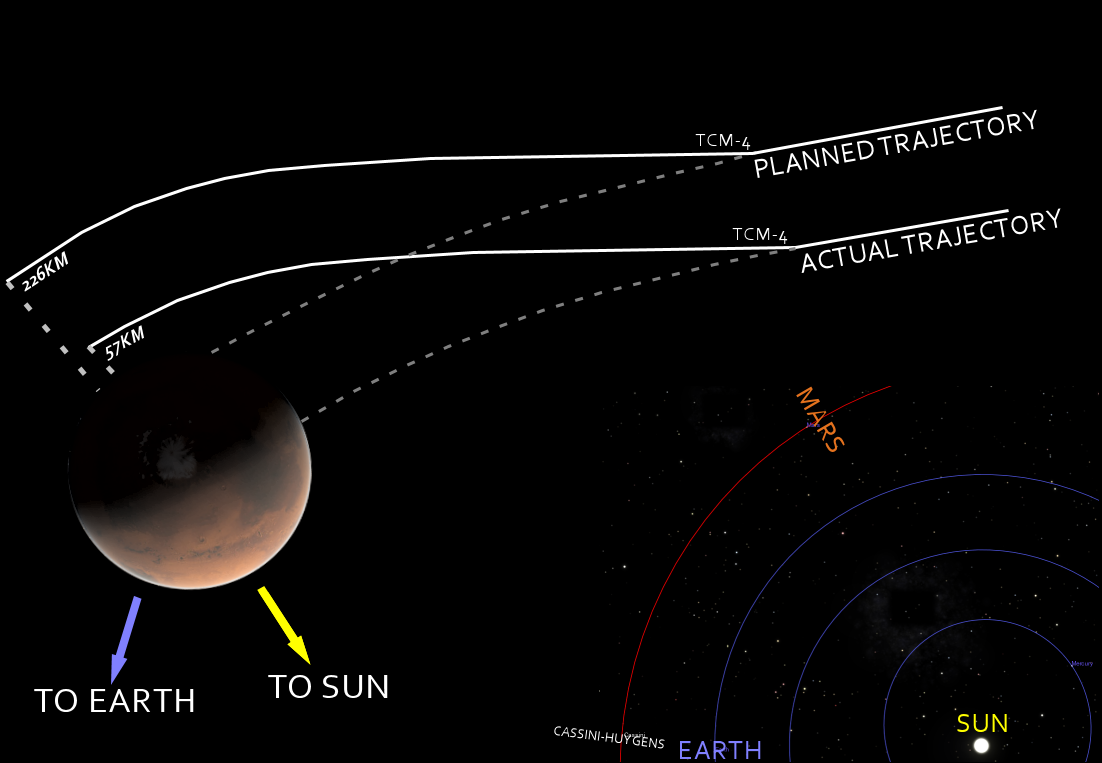
Diagram comparing the intended and actual trajectories of the Orbiter

Mars Climate Orbiter began the planned orbital insertion maneuver on September 23, 1999, at 09:00:46 UTC. Mars Climate Orbiter went out of radio contact when the spacecraft passed behind Mars at 09:04:52 UTC, 49 seconds earlier than expected, and communication was never reestablished. Due to complications arising from human error, the spacecraft encountered Mars at a lower-than-anticipated altitude and it was either destroyed in the atmosphere or re-entered heliocentric space after leaving Mars's atmosphere. Mars Reconnaissance Orbiter has since completed most of the intended objectives for this mission.

== Cause of failure ==
The problem here was not the error; it was the failure of NASA's systems engineering, and the checks and balances in our processes, to detect the error. That's why we lost the spacecraft.

— Edward Weiler, NASA associate administrator for space science

On November 10, 1999, the Mars Climate Orbiter Mishap Investigation Board released a Phase I report, detailing the suspected issues encountered with the loss of the spacecraft.

Previously, on September 8, 1999, Trajectory Correction Maneuver-4 (TCM-4) was computed, and was then executed on September 15, 1999. It was intended to place the spacecraft at an optimal position for an orbital insertion maneuver that would bring the spacecraft around Mars at an altitude of 226 km (140 mi) on September 23, 1999.

However, during the week between TCM-4 and the orbital insertion maneuver, the navigation team reported that it appeared the insertion altitude could be much lower than planned, at about 150–170 km (93–106 mi). Twenty-four hours prior to orbital insertion, calculations placed the orbiter at an altitude of 110 km (68 mi). 80 km (50 mi) was the minimum altitude that Mars Climate Orbiter was thought to be capable of surviving during this maneuver.

During insertion, the orbiter was intended to skim through Mars's upper atmosphere, gradually aerobraking for weeks, but post-failure calculations showed that the spacecraft's trajectory would have taken it within 57 km (35 mi) of the surface. At this altitude, the spacecraft would likely have skipped violently off the denser-than-expected atmosphere, and it was either destroyed in the atmosphere, or re-entered heliocentric space.

The primary cause of this discrepancy was that one piece of ground software supplied by Lockheed Martin produced results in a United States customary unit, contrary to its Software Interface Specification (SIS), while a second system, supplied by NASA, expected those results to be in SI units, in accordance with the SIS. Specifically, software that calculated the total impulse produced by thruster firings produced results in pound-force seconds. The trajectory calculation software then used these results – expected to be in newton-seconds (incorrect by a factor of 4.45) – to update the predicted position of the spacecraft.

Still, NASA does not place the responsibility on Lockheed for the mission loss; instead, various officials at NASA have stated that NASA itself was at fault for failing to make the appropriate checks and tests that would have caught the discrepancy.

The discrepancy between calculated and measured position, resulting in the discrepancy between desired and actual orbit insertion altitude, had been noticed earlier by at least two navigators, whose concerns were dismissed because they "did not follow the rules about filling out [the] form to document their concerns". A meeting of trajectory software engineers, trajectory software operators (navigators), propulsion engineers, and managers was convened to consider the possibility of executing Trajectory Correction Maneuver-5, which was in the schedule. Attendees of the meeting recall an agreement to conduct TCM-5, but it was ultimately not done.

The loss of the Mars Climate Orbiter took place two and a half months before the loss of the Mars Polar Lander. Inadequate funding and poor management have been cited as underlying causes of the failures. According to Thomas Young, chairman of the Mars Program Independent Assessment Team, the Mars Surveyor '98 program "was under funded by at least 30%."

=== Project costs ===
According to NASA, project costs for the orbiter and lander included $193.1 million (Note: $355 million in 2025) for spacecraft development and $42.8 million (Note: $79 million in 2025) for mission operations. Adding in $91.7 million for launch (Note: $169 million in 2025) brought the total to $327.6 million. (Note: $603 million in 2025)

== See also ==
- List of missions to Mars
- List of artificial objects on Mars
- List of software bugs
- Metrication
