= Malin Space Science Systems =

Private technology company

Malin Space Science Systems (MSSS)
- Company type: Privately held company
- Founded: 1990
- Headquarters: San Diego, California
- Key people: Michael C. Malin, CEO

Malin Space Science Systems (MSSS) is a San Diego, California-based private technology company that designs, develops, and operates instruments and technical equipment to fly on uncrewed spacecraft. MSSS is headed by chief scientist and CEO Michael C. Malin.

== History ==
Founded in 1990, their first mission was the failed 1993 Mars Observer for which they developed and operated the Mars Observer Camera Ground Data System. After this mission they were selected to provide the main camera for Mars Global Surveyor. They also developed the cameras that were carried on Mars Polar Lander, Mars Climate Orbiter, 2001 Mars Odyssey, Mars Reconnaissance Orbiter and Phoenix lander.

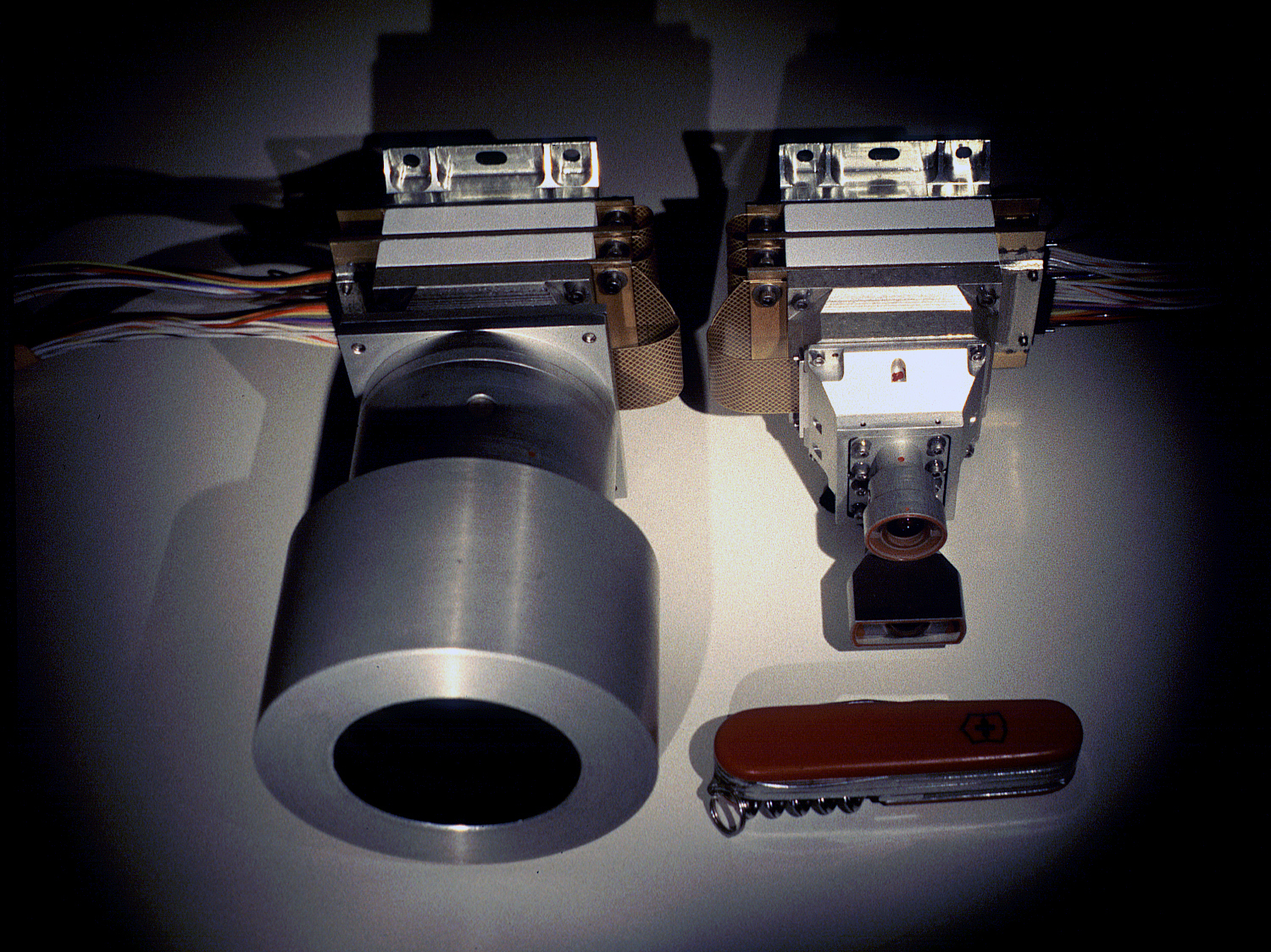
Mars Color Imager on the Mars Reconnaissance Orbiter

One of the most successful of their instruments to date was the Mars Observer Camera (MOC), on board the Mars Global Surveyor placed into orbit around Mars in September 1997. From that date until November 2006, the MOC took more than 243,000 images of Mars, some at very high resolution. Among the MOCs notable successes was the imaging of the landing sites of the two Mars Exploration Rovers (the discarded heatshield of one of the rovers was located). Even before they landed, images from the MOC were very useful in picking the destinations of the two rovers.

After more than nine years of active duty, the Mars Global Surveyor ceased sending data back to Earth and it is now lost along with all its instruments, including the MOC.

For the Mars Reconnaissance Orbiter, launched on August 12, 2005, MSSS built the Mars Color Imager (MARCI) which takes wide angle, daily global views of Mars and the Context Imager (CTX) which has a six-metre resolution.

The Mars Science Laboratory was launched in 2011 and it carries three MSSS cameras. The MastCam is the main camera on board taking still and motion images of the surroundings. The 'HandLens Imager' is on the instrument arm and provides close up images of Martian soil and rocks. Finally the Mars Descent Imager (MARDI) provided high resolution images of the ground during descent.

In December 2004, MSSS was selected to provide three cameras for the Lunar Reconnaissance Orbiter (2008) mission, under contract to Northwestern University. The MSSS developed JunoCam for the Juno Jupiter Mission, which launched in 2011.

In July 2014, NASA announced the selection of the Mastcam-Z proposal for the Mars 2020 rover mission, provided by MSSS. It is an improved zoom version of the original MastCam.

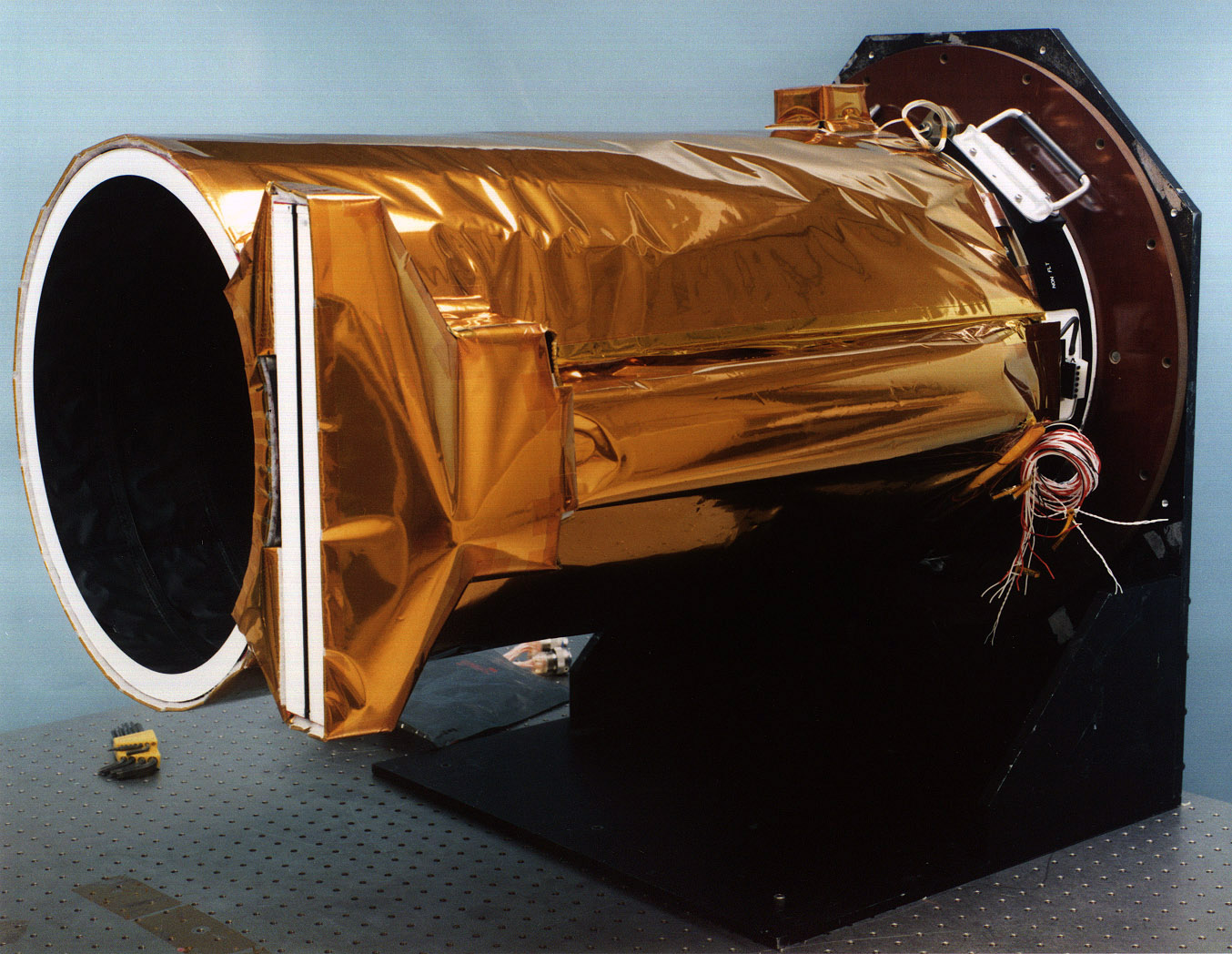
The Mars Orbiter Camera, built by Malin Space Science Systems and used by NASA on the Mars Observer and Mars Global Surveyor spacecraft.

== Liquid water on Mars ==
In June 2000, evidence for water currently under the surface of Mars was discovered in the form of flood-like gullies. The question that was immediately asked was: is this an ongoing process or is this ancient and simply well preserved evidence of water/liquid flow? Most scientists agree that it is highly likely that water did flow on Mars in the distant past.

Malin's camera controllers attempted to answer this question by taking photos of the same locations and in 2005 observation showed two areas where change had clearly occurred within the time of the photos (in other words, the activity was happening in present time and was not ancient).

On December 6, 2006, MSSS announced that it had discovered evidence that liquid water had likely flowed on Mars within the past five years. At a press conference, NASA showed images taken by the Mars Global Surveyor that suggested that water occasionally flows on the surface of Mars. The images did not actually show flowing water. Rather, they showed changes in craters and sediment deposits, providing the strongest evidence yet that water coursed through them as recently as several years ago, and is perhaps doing so even now. The findings were published in the December 8, 2006 issue of the journal Science.

Malin Systems published several documents which describe what they found:

- New Gully Deposit in a Crater in Terra Sirenum: Evidence That Water Flowed on Mars in This Decade?
- Support for Hypothesis that Groundwater is Source for Fluid Responsible for Erosion in Martian Gullies
- Why the New Gully Deposits Are Not Dry Dust Slope Streaks

Before the December 2006 paper, some researchers were skeptical that liquid water was responsible for the surface features seen by the spacecraft. They said other materials such as sand or dust can flow like a liquid and produce similar results. At this stage, (late 2006) the flowing water hypothesis looks strong, however more evidence is needed. For more, see Life on Mars.

== Geysers on Mars ==
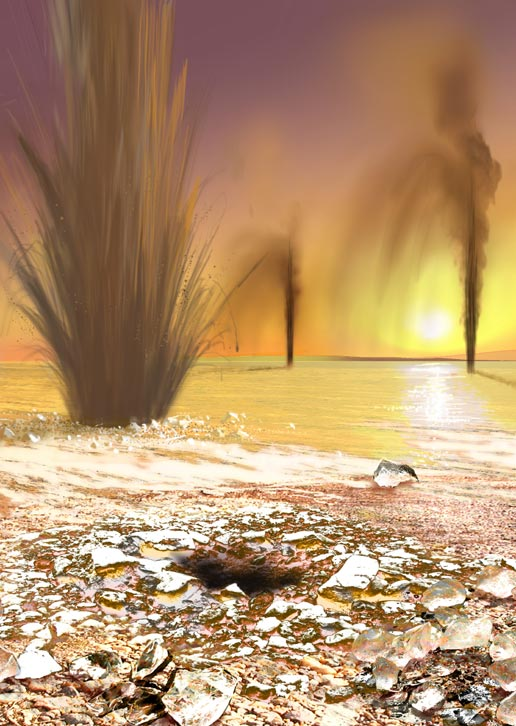
Artist concept showing sand-laden jets erupt from geysers on Mars, producing 'dark dune spots'. (published by NASA; artist: Ron Miller.

The MSSS cameras on board the Mars Global Surveyor, produced high resolution images that were also processed by Malin Space Science Systems, and discovered the intriguing polar features informally known as 'dark dune spots' and 'spiders'. The origin of dark dune spots and the dark slope streaks emanating from them is yet uncertain, and various hypotheses have been put forward on their origin and formation process. The current model proposed by NASA and European teams propose cold geyser-like systems that eject CO_{2} and dark basaltic sand. The seasonal frosting of some areas near the southern ice cap results in the formation of transparent 1 metre thick slabs of dry ice above the ground. With the arrival of spring, sunlight warms the subsurface and pressure from subliming CO_{2} builds up under a slab, elevating and ultimately rupturing it. This leads to geyser-like eruptions of CO_{2} gas mixed with dark basaltic sand or dust. This process is rapid, observed happening in the space of a few days, weeks or months, a growth rate rather unusual in geology – especially for Mars. The gas rushing underneath a slab to the site of a geyser carves a spider-like pattern of radial channels under the ice.

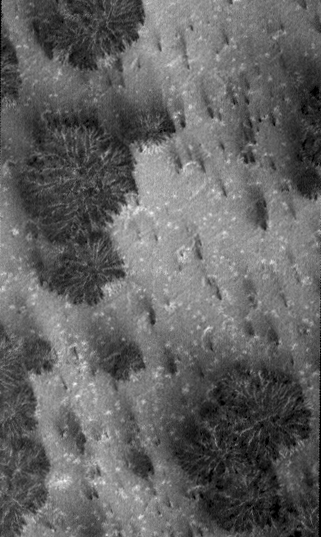
Dark dune spots on Mars, taken by the Mars Global Surveyor and released on October 16, 2000.

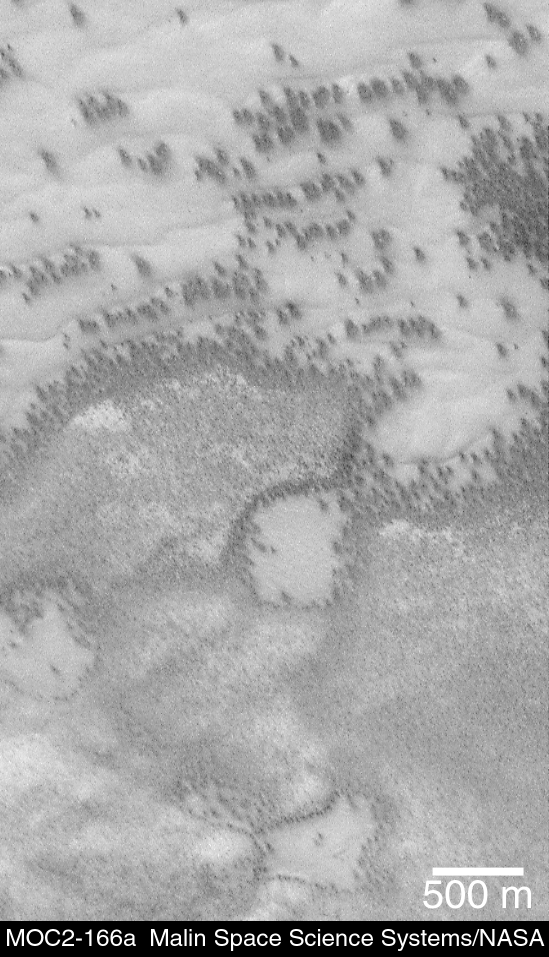
Dark dune spots on Mars, taken by the Mars Global Surveyor on August 10, 1999.

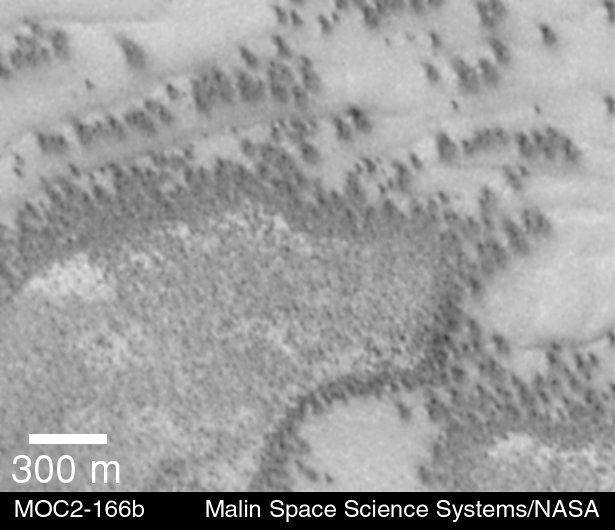
Dark dune spots on Mars, taken by the Mars Global Surveyor on August 10, 1999.

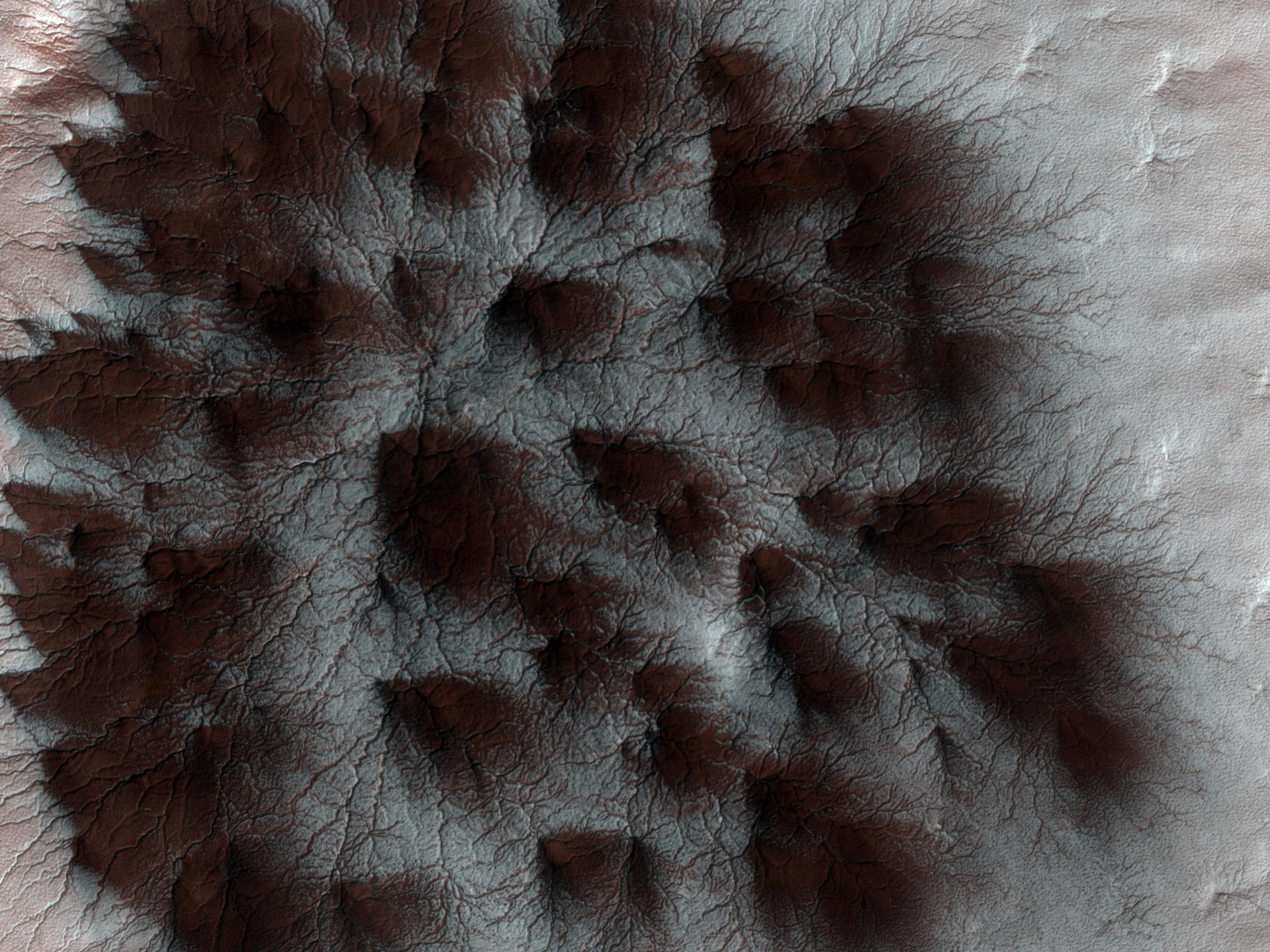
A large 'spider' feature apparently emanating sediment to give rise to dark dune spots. Area size: 1 km (0.62 mi) across.

== List of products ==
Malin manufactured the following cameras for NASA spacecraft:

- Context (CTX) Camera
- JunoCam
- Mars Color Imager
- Mars Descent Imager (MARDI)
- Mars Hand Lens Imager (MAHLI)
- Mars Orbiter Camera
- Lunar Reconnaissance Orbiter Cameras (LROC) Wide Angle Camera (WAC), Sequence and Compressor System (SCS) and 2 Narrow Angle Cameras (NACs)
- Mast Camera on Mars Curiosity Rover (MastCam)
- TAGCAMS, a set of three navigation and sample stow cameras for OSIRIS-REx
