= Keck Institute for Space Studies =

American-based think tank and research center

Coordinates: 34.1368°N 118.1260°W

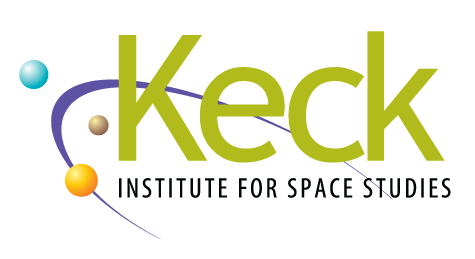
- Founder: Thomas Prince
- Established: 2008
- Mission: Advancing space mission concepts and technologies through collaborative research among scientists, engineers, and students.
- Focus: Space exploration Earth science Astrophysics; Planetary science
- Director: Bethany Ehlmann
- Address: 345 S. Michigan Ave. Pasadena, CA 91106
- Location: Pasadena, California, United States
- Website: kiss.caltech.edu/index.html

The Keck Institute for Space Studies (KISS) is a joint institute of the California Institute of Technology and NASA's Jet Propulsion Laboratory established in January 2008 with a $24 million grant from the W. M. Keck Foundation. It is a privately funded think tank focused on space mission concepts and technology.

The 2020 Global Go To Think Tank Index Reports annual ranking from the Think Tanks and Civil Societies Program at the University of Pennsylvania have listed KISS in the "Top Science and Technology Policy Think Tanks".

== History ==
Founded in 2008 with funding from the W. M. Keck Foundation and support from the Jet Propulsion Laboratory (JPL), the Keck Institute for Space Studies (KISS) is housed at the California Institute of Technology (Caltech). The institute was created to develop new concepts and technology for future space missions, fostering collaboration between researchers at Caltech and JPL. Unlike traditional research centers with fixed memberships, KISS functions as a combination of a think tank and a practical research facility.

KISS's operational model involves two key phases: generating ideas (the "think" phase) and funding promising ideas for further development (the "do" phase). This model, as described by Tom Prince, the director of KISS and a professor of physics at Caltech, is designed to ensure that discussions lead to actionable results. Annually, KISS invites proposals for new workshops on various space-related topics. These workshops are led by teams that typically include members from Caltech, JPL, and external experts. Following these workshops, teams have the opportunity to conduct a two-year study to further explore the ideas generated.

== Notable projects ==
Several significant projects have originated or expanded from KISS workshops, including:

- Asteroid Redirect Mission: This concept, proposed in 2010, was later validated and included in NASA's planning.
- InSight Mars Lander: The 2010 workshop on planetary seismology influenced the development of this mission.
- NASA's Centennial Challenge: A suggestion from a 2013 study led to the formation of this challenge.
- Geochronology on Mars: A concept from a 2009 workshop was implemented using the Curiosity rover.
- Early Universe Studies: A 2010 workshop resulted in new approaches for studying the universe's first billion years.

== KISS Affiliates program ==
A crucial component of KISS's impact is its Affiliates program. Nominated by Caltech faculty, KISS Affiliates comprise graduate students and postdocs recognized as future leaders in space exploration. The program's design allows these young scientists and engineers to participate in the practicalities and realities of space missions and research, with the intention to bridge the gap between academic study and real-world application. The program offers Affiliates opportunities to engage directly with high-profile figures in the space industry, including CEOs of leading companies, experienced astronauts, mission leaders, senior NASA officials, and world-renowned researchers in space exploration.

== Location ==
The Keck Institute for Space Studies is located in the Keck Center, which includes two buildings: the renovated Tolman/Bacher House and a new structure erected next door. The center, designed by Lehrer Architects, was dedicated on September 15, 2014, to honor the long-term support of Caltech by the W. M. Keck Foundation and its founder William Myron Keck.

The Keck Center was recently given LEED (Leadership in Energy and Environmental Design) Platinum certification, the highest level of recognition for sustainability given by the U.S. Green Building Council. The project earned points for stabilizing and restoring the Tolman/Bacher House and for incorporating such details into the new building as abundant natural light, natural ventilation, and the ability to open up the lobby of the new building to take advantage of the complex's indoor and outdoor spaces.

The Tolman/Bacher house has been a home to two Caltech professors - Richard Tolman and Robert Bacher.
