= Michael C. Malin =

American astronomer and space-scientist

Michael C. Malin (born 1950) is an American astronomer, space scientist, and CEO of Malin Space Science Systems. His cameras have been important scientific instruments in the exploration of Mars.

Malin designed and ran the orbiting Mars camera (part of the larger Mars Global Surveyor spacecraft) which took over 212,000 high-resolution photos of Mars over a nine-year period. In late 2006, he and Kenneth Edgett announced photographic evidence which strongly suggested water was flowing on Mars in the present day.

== History ==
A native of California, born in Los Angeles, Michael Malin earned a B.A. from U.C. Berkeley in Physics with a minor in English literature. He then attended Caltech, where he earned a Ph.D. in Planetary Sciences and Geology in 1975. After his doctorate, he worked for four years at NASA's Jet Propulsion Laboratory, where he was involved with the Viking 1 and Voyager missions. He taught geology at Arizona State University for 11 years before returning to California and founding Malin Space Science Systems.

== Malin Space Science Systems ==
Malin was convinced that valuable science could be done by a high resolution camera orbiting Mars. However, he met with skepticism from NASA officials. Malin was told "Viking had already taken all the pictures we ever needed of Mars." Malin thought that position was absurd. (Interview, Space.com 6/2000). Malin and Ed Danielson, a friend from Caltech days, jointly thought up a camera which would be able to resolve objects 6.5 feet across. NASA was not very interested but, in 1985, they gave Malin and Danielson $50,000 to come up with a proposal. Their design was telescope mated to an electronic camera. The camera was approved, and Malin now had to build it.

Building the camera took years and was delayed several times by NASA. In the spring of 1992, with launch only months away, the camera was installed on the Mars Observer. The launch was successful and in January 1993 it took some photos but then, the Observer spacecraft ceased operations. Fortunately, MSSS had built a double and so two years later, the double was sent up (in November 1996) and that camera worked flawlessly for the next decade.

- Malin was the lead scientist on the Mars Orbiter Camera.
- Malin was a scientist on the Mars Pathfinder mission in 1996.
- He was the Principal Investigator on the Mars Color Imager (MARSI) (1998), a two-camera system designed to observe the color of Mars.
- He had the same role for the 1999 Mars Polar Lander (which mysteriously failed to report back any data).
- Malin and his team helped build THEMIS (Thermal Emission Imaging System) on the 2001 Mars Odyssey mission.
- Malin was the Principal Investigator on the 2005 Mars Reconnaissance Orbiter MARCI, a reflight of the 1998 Mars Color Imager.

Malin has authored a number of papers based on the photos returned from the Mars Orbiter Camera (MOC). His most significant claim is that photographic evidence from the MOC strongly suggests recent flow of water on the surface of Mars. This claim was initially met with skepticism but it has been bolstered by recent photographic evidence (see Life on Mars for more details).

The Surveyor exceeded its designed life by many years but in November 2006 it stopped sending back data. As of December 2006, the NASA program manager said it is likely that the spacecraft and all its instruments (including the Malin MOC) were lost.

== Awards ==
- 2017 Whipple Award
- 2005 Carl Sagan Memorial Award
- 1987 MacArthur Fellows Program

== Works ==
- Malin, Michael C.; Edgett, Kenneth S. (2000). "Evidence for Recent Groundwater Seepage and Surface Runoff on Mars". Science. 288 (5475): 2330–2335. Bibcode:2000Sci...288.2330M. doi:10.1126/science.288.5475.2330. PMID 10875910.
