= James F. Bell III =

American astronomer

Jim Bell
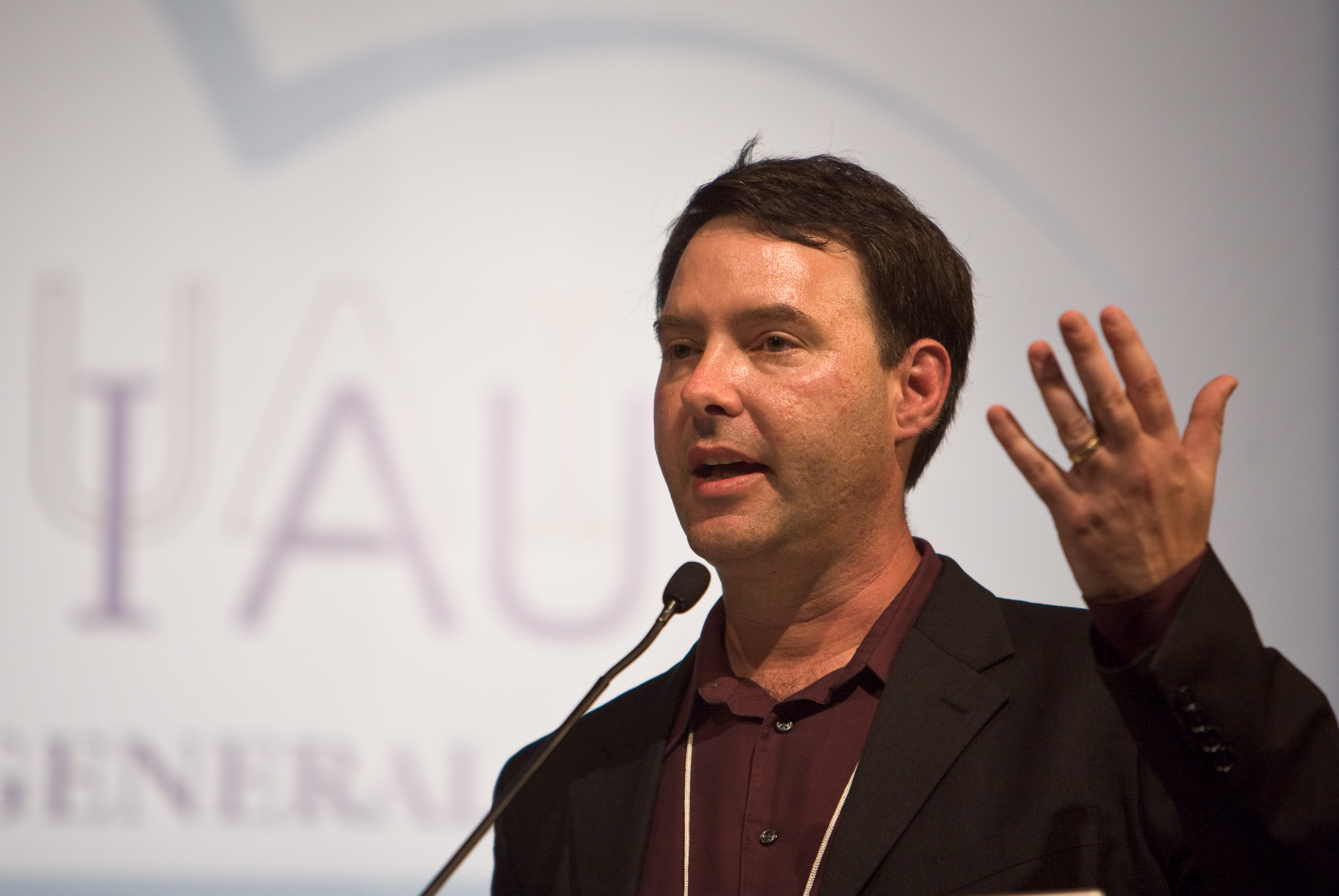
- Jim Bell in 2009
- Born: July 23, 1965 (age 61); Coventry, Rhode Island
- Education: California Institute of Technology; University of Hawaiʻi at Mānoa
- Scientific career
- Fields: Planetary geology Geochemistry; Mineralogy
- Workplaces: Arizona State University; Cornell University

James F. Bell III (born July 23, 1965) is a professor of Astronomy at Arizona State University, specializing in the study of planetary geology, geochemistry and mineralogy using data obtained from telescopes and from various spacecraft missions. Bell's active research has involved the NASA Mars Pathfinder, Near Earth Asteroid Rendezvous (NEAR), Comet Nucleus Tour (CONTOUR), 2001 Mars Odyssey, Mars Reconnaissance Orbiter, Lunar Reconnaissance Orbiter, and the Mars Science Laboratory missions. His book Postcards from Mars includes many images taken by the Mars rovers. Bell is currently an editor of the space science journal Icarus and president of The Planetary Society. He has served as the lead scientist in charge of the Panoramic camera (Pancam) color imaging system on Mars rovers Spirit and Opportunity.

== Education ==
Bell earned his B.S. degree in Planetary Science and Aeronautics from the California Institute of Technology in 1987. He earned his M.S. degree in Geology and Geophysics in 1989 and his Ph.D. in Planetary Geosciences in 1992 from the University of Hawaiʻi at Mānoa.

== Career ==
Bell is an active planetary scientist and has been involved in many NASA robotic space exploration missions. As a professional scientist, he has published over 30 first-authored and 140 co-authored scientific research papers and over 400 short abstracts and conference presentations. Bell has also written and edited several books about Mars and the Moon. He is active in educating the public about space exploration. He is a frequent contributor to popular astronomy and science magazines, has made a number of television appearances on major network and cable channels, and gives free public lectures. He is currently a professor at the Arizona State University School of Earth and Space Exploration and an adjunct professor at the Cornell University Astronomy Department's Center for Radiophysics and Space Research. In July 2014, Bell was selected to be the principal investigator overseeing the Mastcam-Z imaging system for the upcoming Mars 2020 rover mission.

== Awards and honors ==
Bell has received a number of awards and honors during his career. Most recently, he was awarded the 2011 Carl Sagan Medal from the American Astronomical Society Division for Planetary Sciences, for excellence in public communication in planetary sciences. Bell has also received NASA Group Achievement Awards for his part in the Mars Exploration Rovers (MER) 3rd and 4th extended missions and the Phoenix Mission Support Team. In 2007 he was named a United States National Academy of Sciences Kavli Fellow, and in 1996 he was awarded the asteroid name 8146 Jimbell by the International Astronomical Union (IAU) in his honor.

== Selected works ==
- Asteroid Rendezvous: NEAR Shoemaker's Adventures at Eros, ISBN 0-521-81360-3 (co-editor, 2002)
- Postcards from Mars: The First Photographer on the Red Planet, ISBN 978-0-525-94985-5 (2006)
- Mars 3-D: A Rover's-Eye View of the Red Planet, ISBN 978-1-4027-5620-7 (2008)
- The Martian Surface: Composition, Mineralogy and Physical Properties, ISBN 978-0-521-86698-9 (editor, 2008)
- Moon 3-D: The Lunar Surface Comes to Life, ISBN 978-1-4027-6551-3 (2009)
- The Space Book: 250 Milestones in the History of Space and Astronomy, ISBN 978-1-4027-8071-4 (2013)
- The Interstellar Age: Inside the Forty-Year Voyager Mission, ISBN 9780698186156 (2015)
