= Mastcam-Z =

Camera on the Perseverance rover

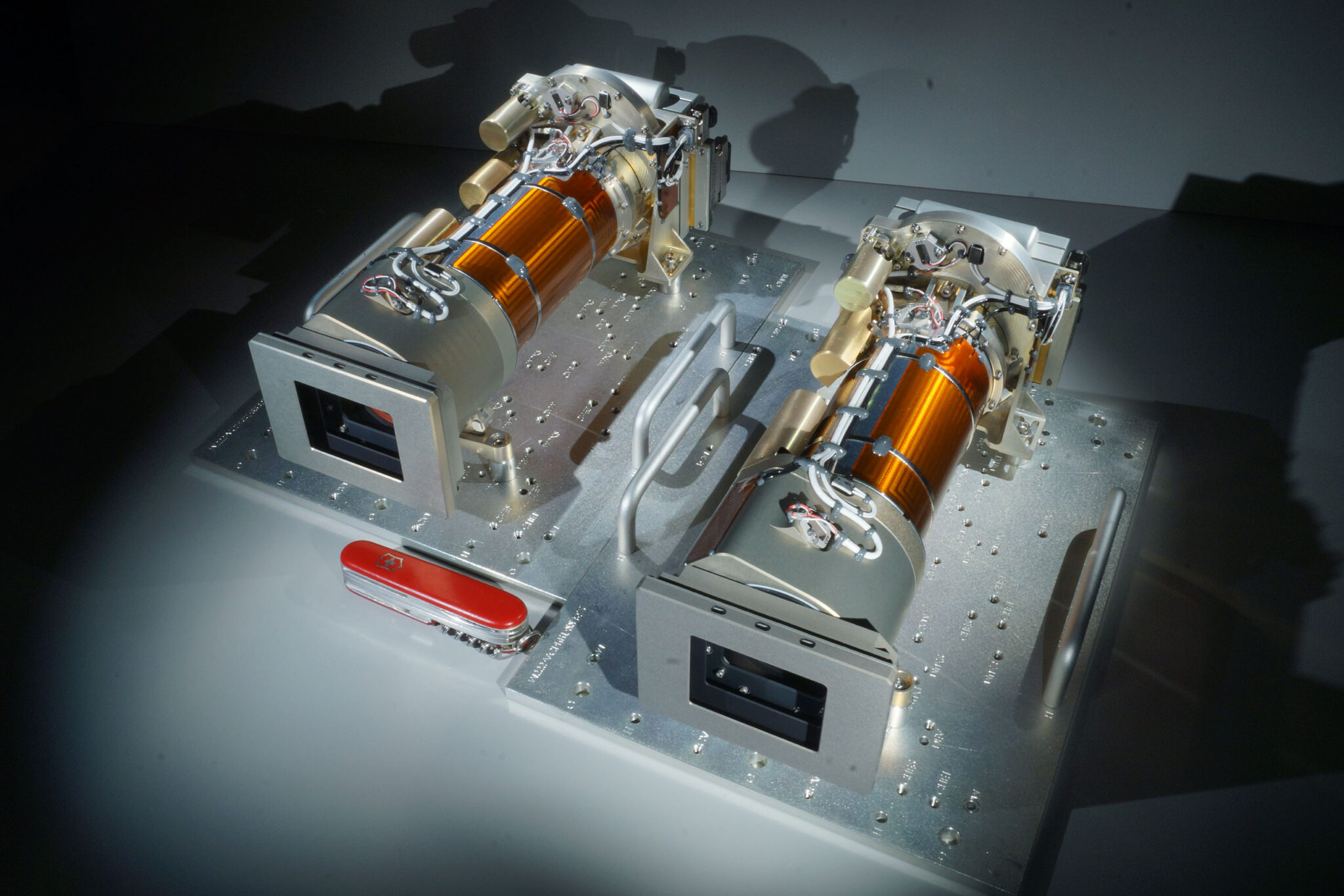
- Mastcam-Z cameras
- Operator: Malin Space Science Systems
- Manufacturer: Malin Space Science Systems
- Instrument type: Multispectral sensors
- Function: Local geomorphology, chemistry, navigation

Properties
- Mass: 1.38 kg (per camera)
- Dimensions: 11cm × 12cm × 26cm (per camera)
- Power consumption: 7.5 W standby and 11.8 W imaging (per camera)
- Resolution: 1600 × 1200 photoactive pixels (1648 × 1214 total)
- Spectral band: varies

Host spacecraft
- Spacecraft: Perseverance rover
- Operator: NASA
- Launch date: 30 July 2020
- Rocket: Atlas V 541
- Launch site: Cape Canaveral SLC-41
- COSPAR ID: 2020-052A

Mastcam-Z is a multispectral, stereoscopic imaging instrument. It serves as the primary science camera on NASA's Perseverance rover. The Principal Investigator is Jim Bell of Arizona State University. The instrument was designed and built by Malin Space Science Systems in San Diego, California.

== Objectives ==
There are three main science objectives:

- Characterize the overall landscape geomorphology, processes, and the nature of the geologic record (mineralogy, texture, structure, and stratigraphy) at the rover field site.
- Assess current atmospheric and astronomical conditions, events, and surface-atmosphere interactions and processes.
- Provide operational support and scientific context for rover navigation, contact science, sample selection, extraction, and caching, and the other selected Mars-2020 investigations.

There are four mission objectives:

- Characterize the processes that formed and modified the geologic record within a field exploration area on Mars selected for evidence of an astrobiologically relevant ancient environment and geologic diversity.
- Perform the following astrobiologically relevant investigations on the geologic materials at the landing site.
- Assemble a returnable cache of samples for possible future return to Earth.
- Contribute to the preparation for human exploration of Mars by making significant progress towards filling at least one major Strategic Knowledge Gap.

== Design and capabilities ==
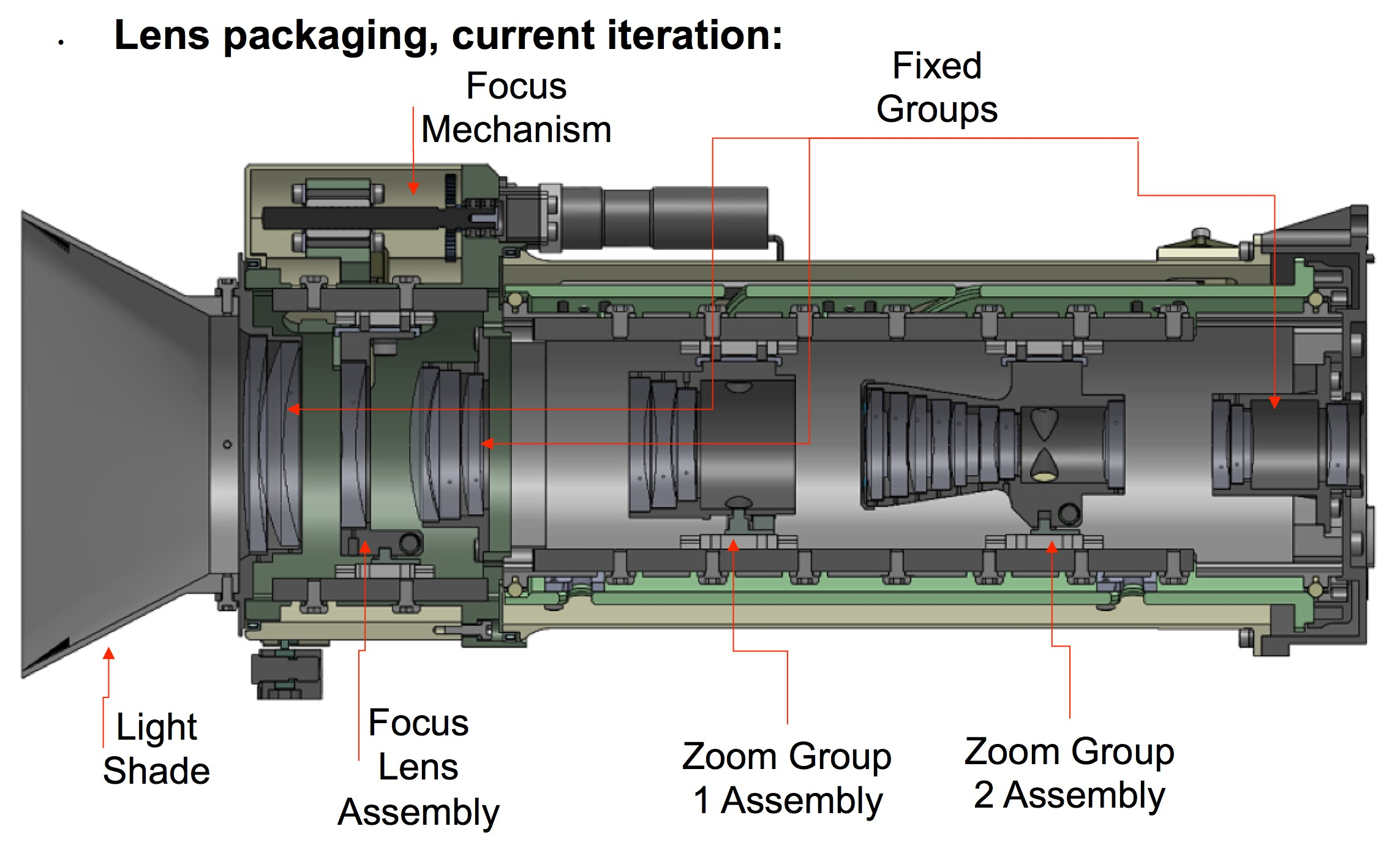
Mastcam-Z engineering diagram

Mastcam-Z consists of two zoom cameras mounted on the remote sensing mast of the Perseverance rover. The design is an evolution of the Mastcam instrument provided for the previous Mars rover, Curiosity. They share the same detectors, electronics interface, firmware, and operations protocols. Mastcam-Z adds a 3.6:1 zoom capability, whereas the Mastcam has two fixed focal lengths. Each of the zoom cameras has a broadband red/green/blue (RGB) imaging and narrow-band visible/near-infrared (VNIR) color imaging. The sensor consists of an ON Semiconductor KAI-2020CM CCD with an array size of 1600 x 1200 pixels and can image fields of view (FOV) from ~ 5° to ~ 15°. This is an approximately equivalent field of view to that which a 135-400mm zoom lens provides on a standard 35mm consumer camera.

The Mastcam-Z team consists of approximately 100 scientists, engineers, technicians, managers, administrators, and students, many of whom have worked on the project since NASA selected the instrument in 2014.

== Calibration targets ==
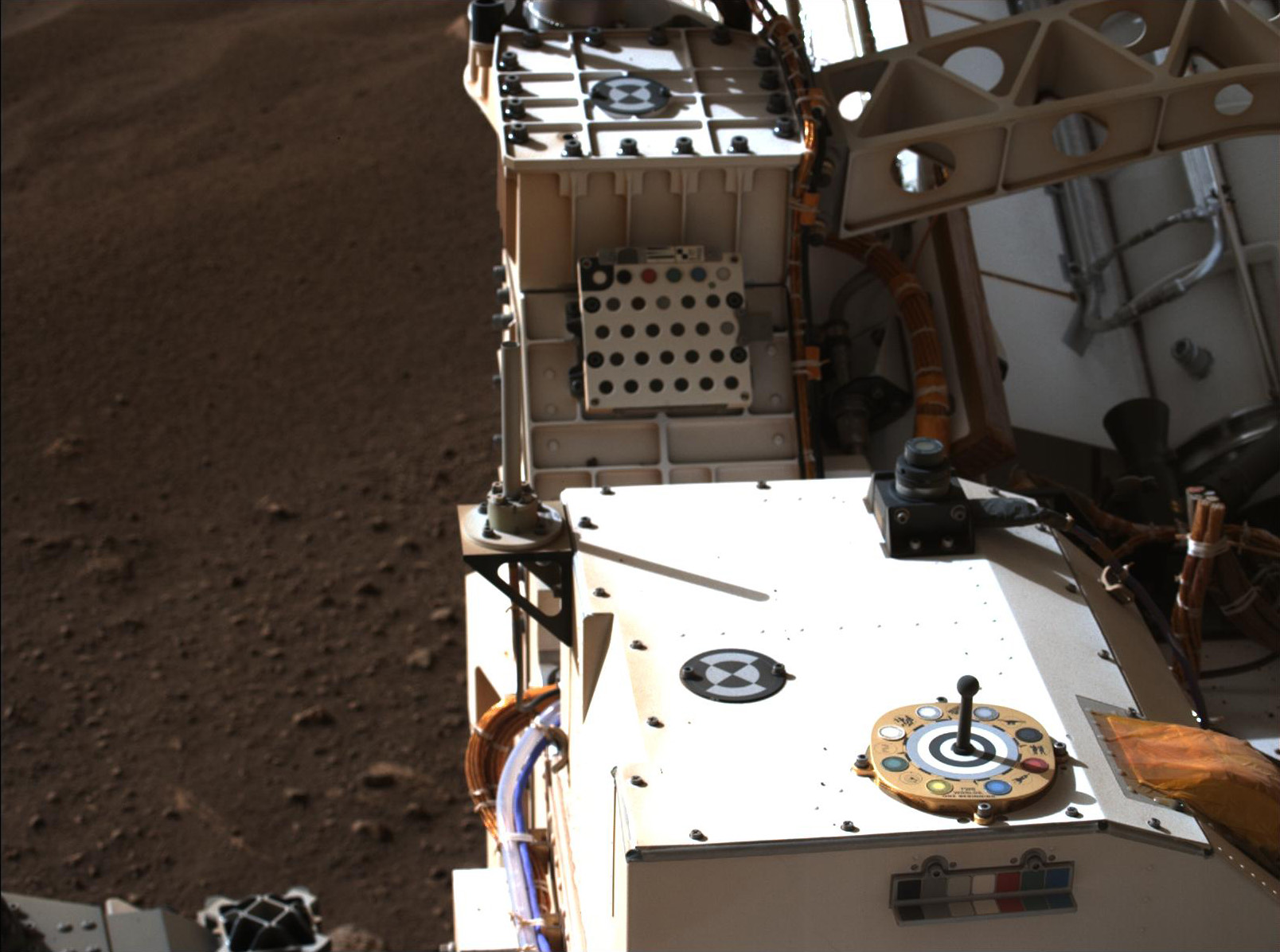
Mastcam-Z's Color Calibration Targets (lower right) as seen on Mars

In order to accurately represent and analyze images of the martian surface, the Perseverance rover carries two swatches of known colors. Mastcam-Z frequently images these calibration targets to gauge the proper color balance and reflectance properties of its targets.

The primary "caltarget" includes ceramic grayscale and color references with known reflectance, magnets to repel dust, and a shadow-post (Gnomon). Seven vignettes between each ceramic color disk represent the inner Solar System and the evolution of life on Earth, human figures, and a stylized space rocket. The vignettes were created by the Mastcam-Z team and The Planetary Society, and approved by NASA. The base plate is inscribed with the message "TWO WORLDS, ONE BEGINNING". Also included is the following message, written in English, Mandarin, Hindi, Spanish, and Arabic:

Are we alone? We came here to look for signs of life, and to collect samples of Mars for study on Earth. To those who follow, we wish a safe journey and the joy of discovery.

A secondary color calibration target is located nearby and is mounted vertically in order to avoid collecting dust from the Martian atmosphere and to provide cross-correlation measurements with the primary caltarget.

== Education and public outreach ==
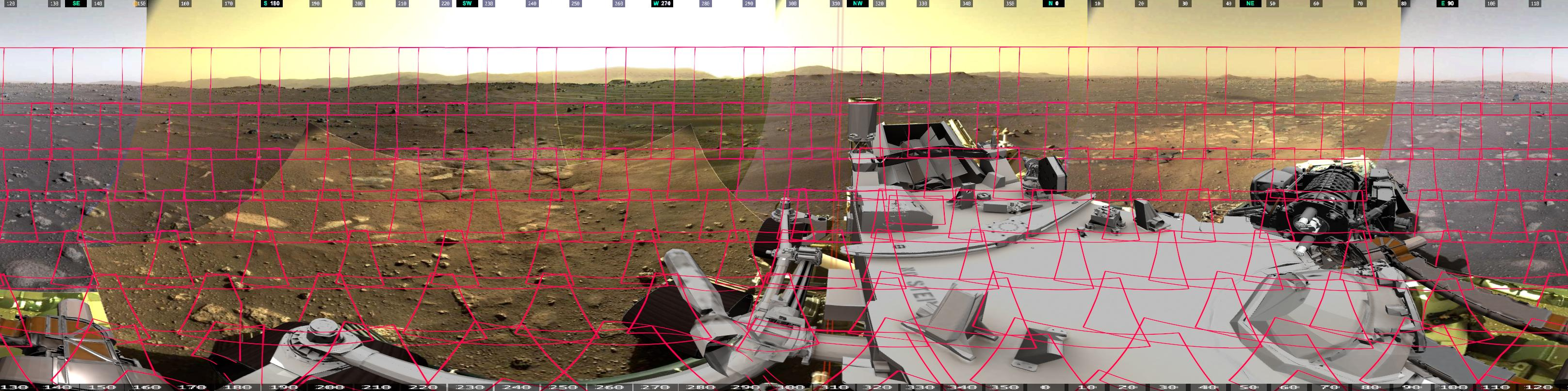
Mars Perseverance rover - MastCam-Z - Creation of 360-Panorama Image (4 March 2021)

The Mastcam-Z science and engineering group teamed up with the Planetary Society of Pasadena, California, to provide public education and outreach. All raw Mastcam-Z images will be published to the web within minutes of downlink to Earth.
