= Mars Color Imager =

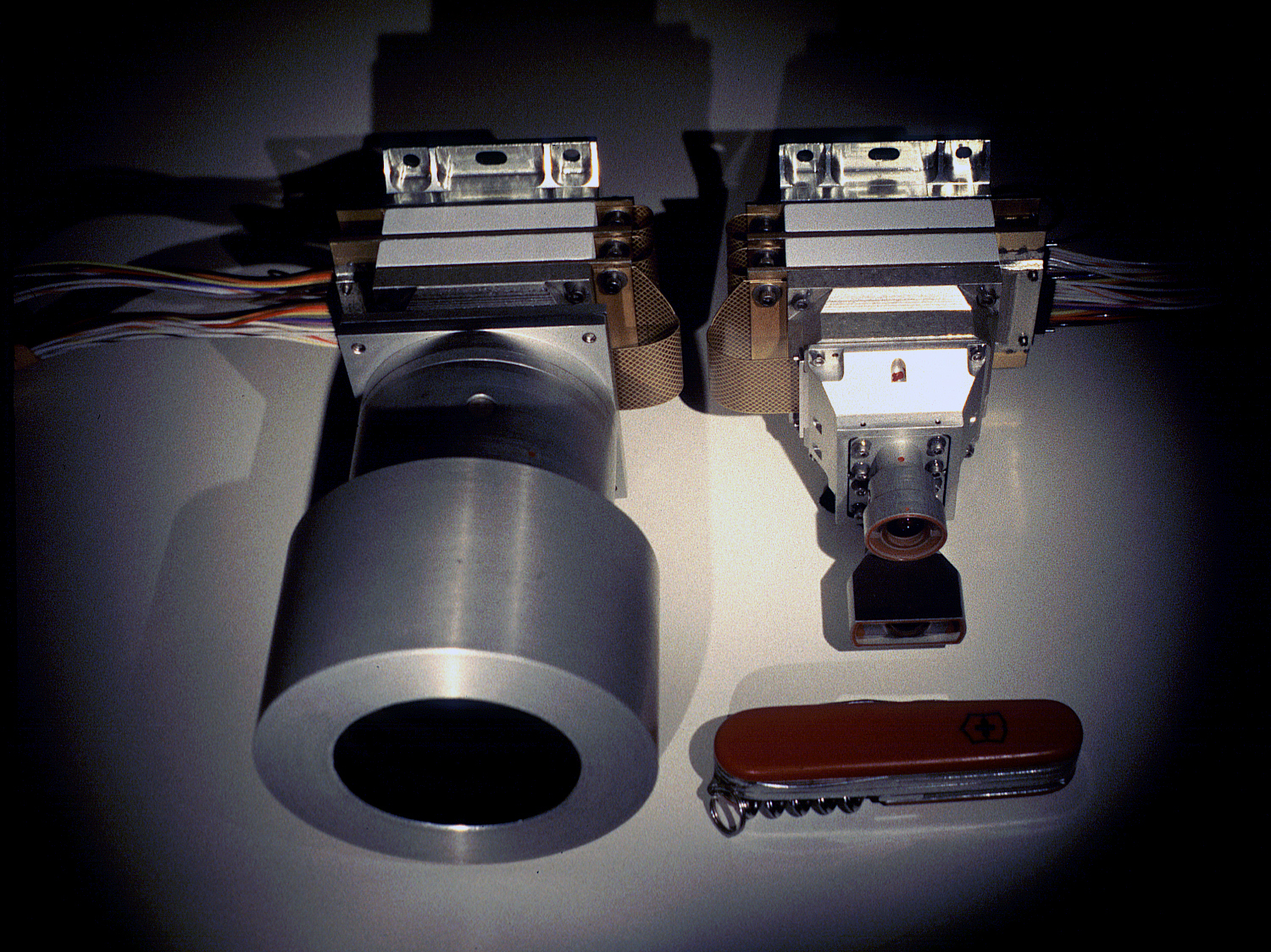
Mars Color Imager on the right side

The Mars Color Imager (MARCI) is a wide-angle, relatively low-resolution camera built for Mars Climate Orbiter and Mars Reconnaissance Orbiter. MARCI views the surface of Mars in five visible and two ultraviolet bands. Each day, MARCI collects about 84 images and produces a global map with pixel resolutions of 1 to 10 km (0.62 to 6.21 mi). This map provides a weekly weather report for Mars, helps to characterize its seasonal and annual variations, and maps the presence of water vapor and ozone in its atmosphere. The camera was built and is operated by Malin Space Science Systems. It has a 180-degree fisheye lens with the seven color filters bonded directly on a single CCD sensor.

== Specifications ==
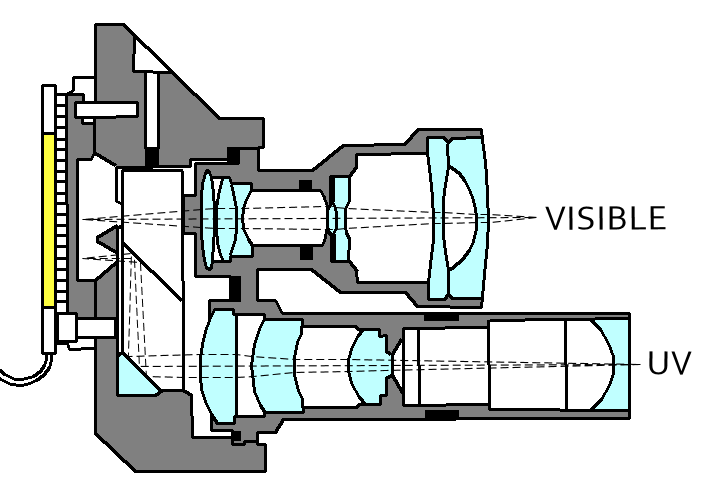
MARCI diagram

MARCI consists of nadir-pointed wide angle and medium angle cameras. Each camera has its own unique optics and identical focal plane assemblies, data acquisition system electronics, and power supplies. MARCI is mounted on the bottom (nadir pointing side) of the spacecraft. Each camera consists of a stray light baffle and lens elements and filters which focus onto an electronically-shuttered CCD. Without the baffle, the wide-angle camera is approximately 4.8 × 4.8 × 3.8 cm and the medium angle camera 5.4 × 5.4 × 5.5 cm. The wide-angle baffle extends an additional 1.4 cm and the medium angle baffle 2 cm. The cameras operate in push-frame fashion, in which a filter plate, consisting of multiple narrowband filter strips in the cross-track direction, is mounted over the detector. Consecutive images are taken each time the camera footprint advances one filter-width (about 20 pixels) in the downtrack direction. The images are 1000 x 1000 pixels in size. The MARCI operating temperature range is −40 to +70 degrees C and survival range is −80 to +100 degrees C.

The wide-angle camera has a field of view of 140 degrees. It has a dual lens system consisting of a five-element fused silica f/6 lens for short UV and a seven-element optical glass f/5 lens for longer UV and visible light. The optical paths of both lens systems are combined by a prism and dichroic beamsplitter, giving an effective focal length of 4.3 mm. It is capable of obtaining images in 7 spectral bands, 5 visible and 2 UV at a resolution of 7.2 km/pixel or better. The raw data rate from the wide-angle camera is 29.6 kbps per band.

The medium-angle camera has a field-of-view of 6 degrees. It has an f/2 catadioptric lens consisting of six elements, five of SiO2 and one of BK7, with an effective focal length of 87.9 mm. Images can be obtained in any of 10 spectral bands, ranging from 425 to 1000 nm, at a nadir resolution of 40 m/pixel. The raw data rate from the medium-angle camera is 704 kbps per band.

Under proper conditions, resolutions up to 1 kilometer (3300 ft) are possible. The principal investigator on this project was Michael Malin at Malin Space Science Systems and the project was reincorporated on Mars Reconnaissance Orbiter. Its objectives:

- Observe Martian atmospheric processes at global scale and synoptically.
- Study details of the interaction of the atmosphere with the surface at a variety of scales in both space and time.
- Examine surface features characteristic of the evolution of the Martian climate over time.

Camera filters
| Filter name | Camera angle | Wavelength | |
| Filter name | Camera angle | (nm) | Color |
|---|---|---|---|
| UV1 | Wide | 280 | Invisible |
| UV2 | Wide | 315 | Invisible |
| MA1 | Medium | 445 | |
| WA1 | Wide | 453 | |
| MA2 | Medium | 501 | |
| WA2 | Wide | 561 | |
| MA3 | Medium | 562 | |
| WA3 | Wide | 614 | |
| WA4 | Wide | 636 | |
| MA4 | Medium | 639 | |
| WA5 | Wide | 765 | |
| MA5 | Medium | 767 | |
| MA6 | Medium | 829 | Slightly visible |
| MA7 | Medium | 903 | Invisible |
| MA8 | Medium | 1002 | Invisible |

== Gallery ==
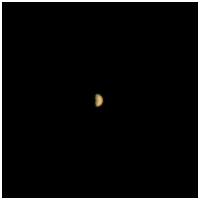
First view of Mars taken by the Mars Climate Orbiter MARCI. It was acquired on 7 September 1999.

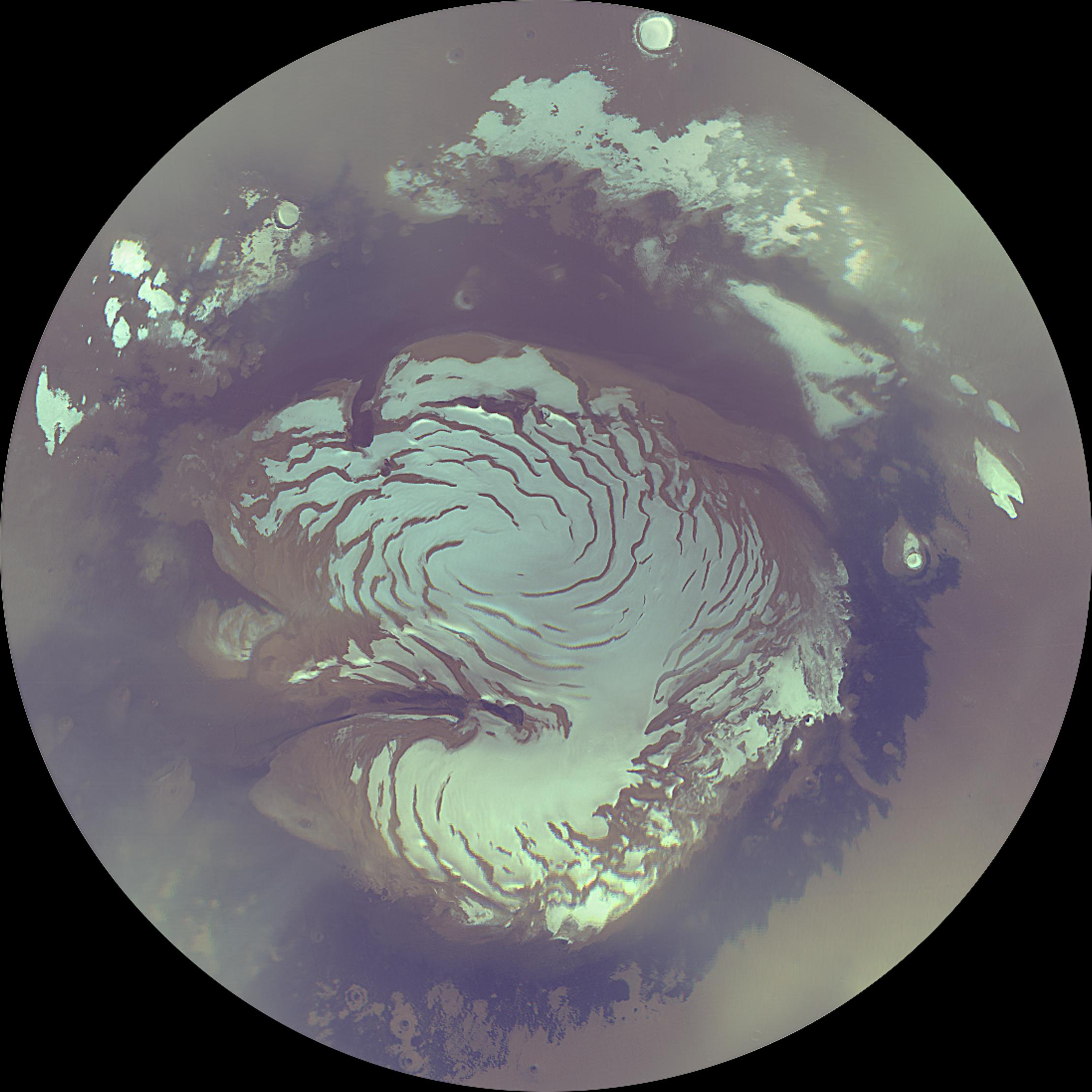
Mars Polar Cap during MRO transition phase instrument checkout

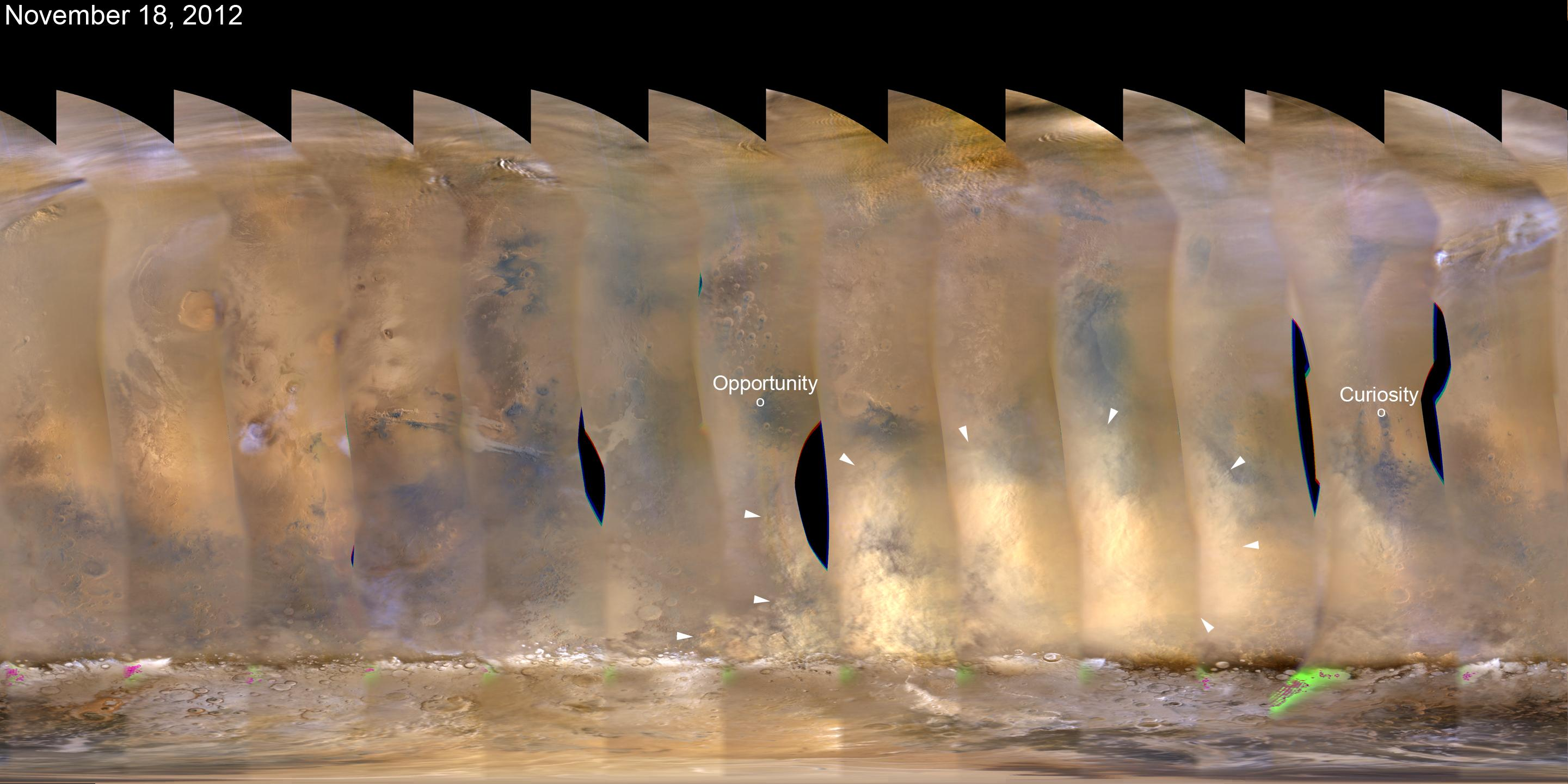
Nearly global mosaic of observations made by the MRO MARCI on Nov. 18, 2012, shows a dust storm in Mars' southern hemisphere

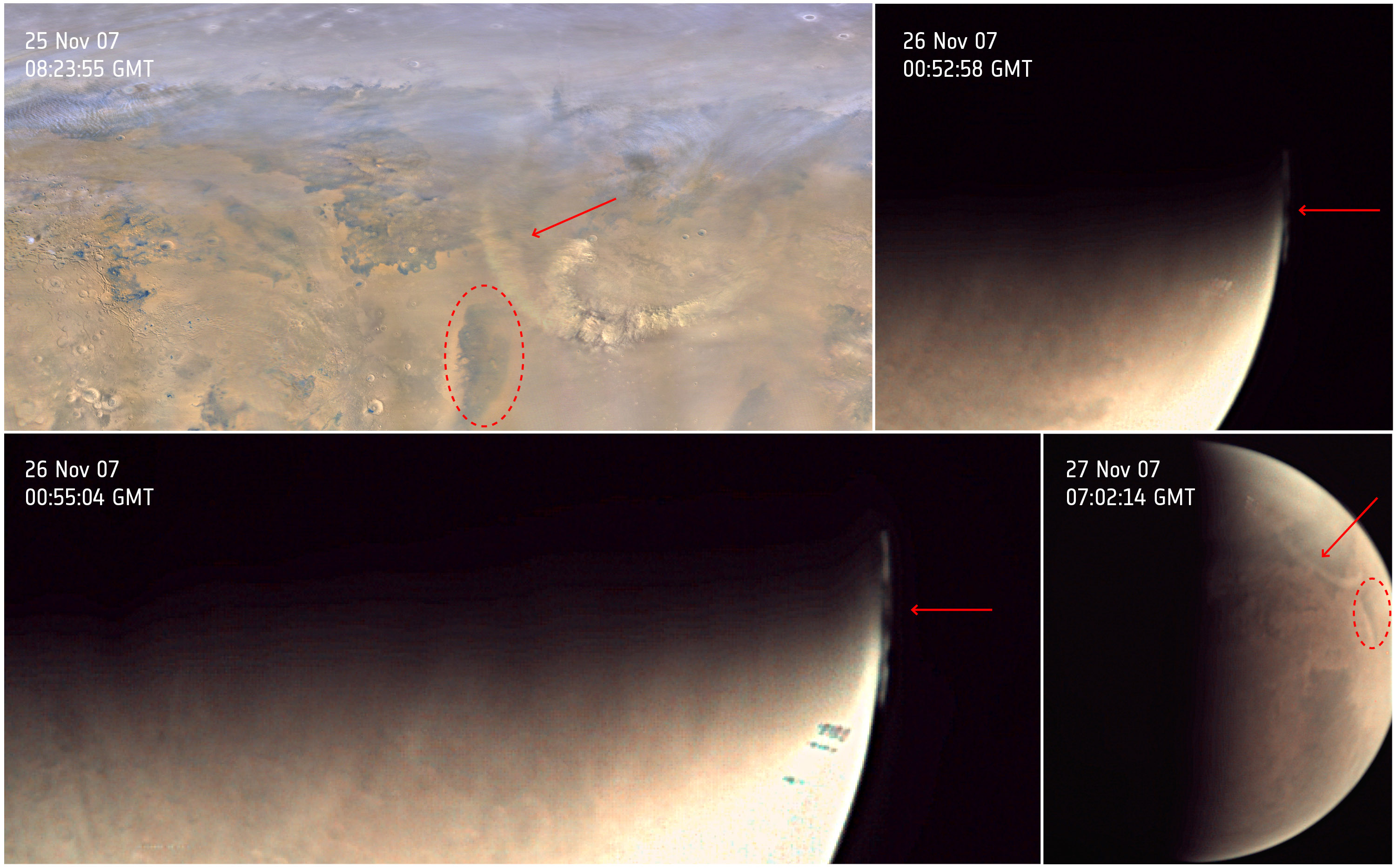
Example of dust clouds imaged by ESA's Mars Express Visual Monitoring Camera and NASA's Mars Reconnaissance Orbiter's MARCI in November 2007 over the Utopia region.

Mars before and after dust storm as seen by MARCI

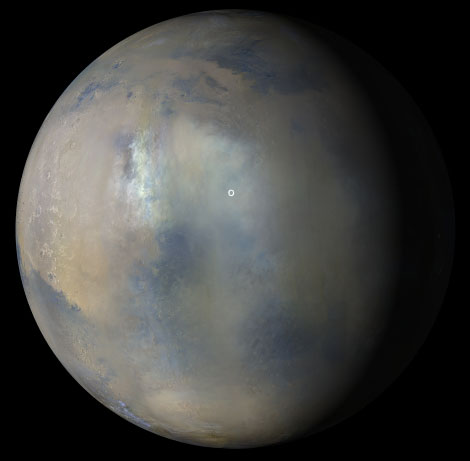
Multiple images from the MARCI were used to generate this view of a regional dust storm obscuring Syrtis Major and Jezero Crater (white circle). The images were acquired on Jan. 9, 2022.
