= Thomas Prince (scientist) =

Scientist and Professor

Thomas A. Prince
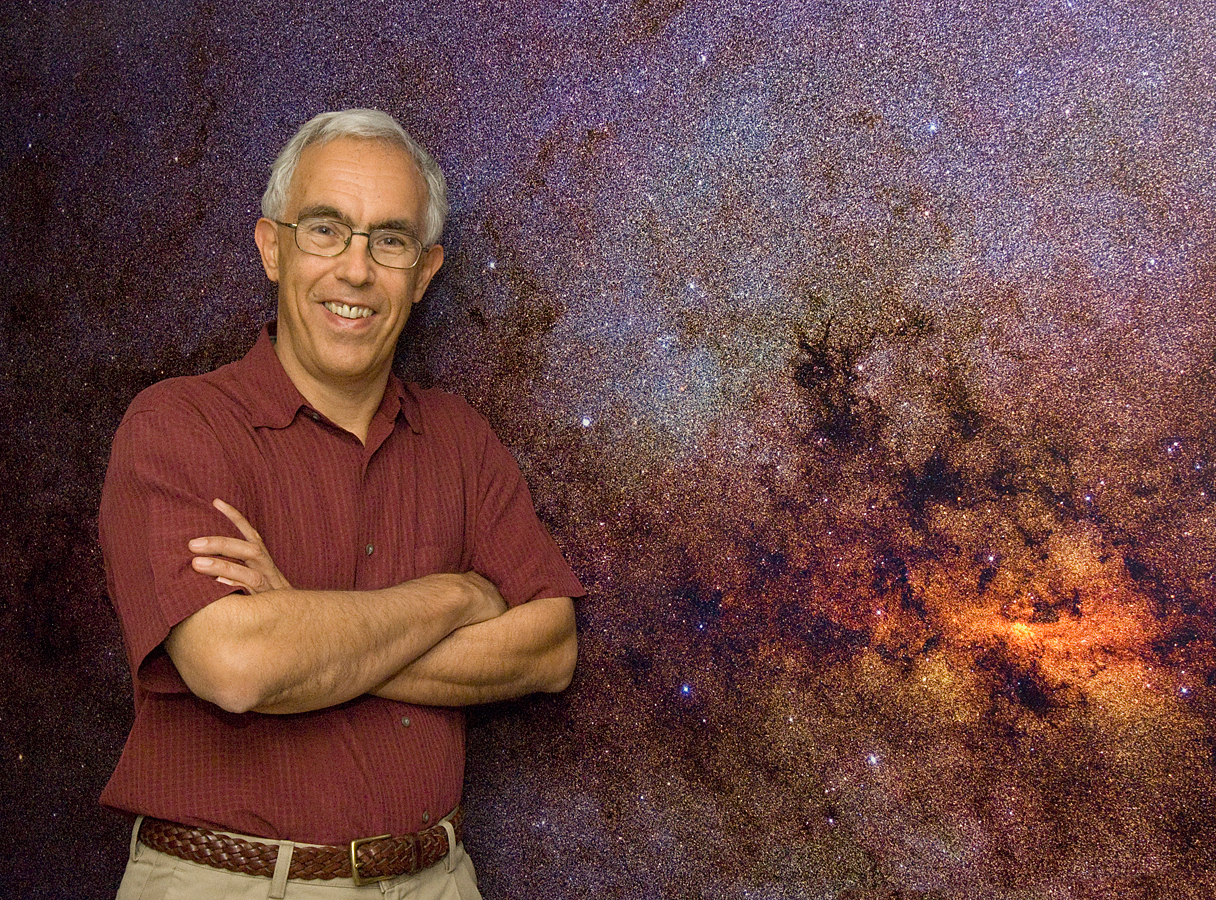
- Born: Cleveland, Ohio, U.S
- Education: Villanova University; University of Chicago
- Occupations: Director of the W. M. Keck Institute for Space Studies; Allen V. C. Davis and Lenabelle Davis Leadership Chair, W. M. Keck Institute for Space Studies; Ira S. Bowen Professor of Physics at the California Institute of Technology; Jet Propulsion Laboratory Senior Research Scientist
- Website: http://www.srl.caltech.edu/~prince/

Dr. Thomas A. Prince is the Ira S. Bowen Professor of Physics at the California Institute of Technology and holds a joint appointment with Caltech’s NASA Jet Propulsion Laboratory (JPL) as a senior research scientist. Between May 2001 and June 2006, Prince was the chief scientist at JPL. He is currently the director and Allen V.C. Davis and Lenabelle Davis Leadership Chair for the W. M. Keck Institute for Space Studies at Caltech.

== Research and career ==
Prince began his research career in experimental cosmic ray astrophysics before coming to the Caltech campus to work in the area of experimental gamma ray astronomy, collaborating with the high-energy astrophysics group at JPL. Prince became a Millikan Fellow in 1980 and joined the Caltech professorial faculty in 1983. Detection and study of neutron stars and black holes has been a continuing theme in Prince's research, starting with his gamma ray observations of compact objects in the Galactic Center region. He participated in several expeditions to the Australian outback in the late 1980s to make balloon observations of the radioactive decay energy from Supernova 1987a.

During the late 1980s and 1990s, Prince became interested in the evolving field of parallel computing which he applied to several areas of astronomy including radio, x-ray and gamma-ray pulsar detection, imaging infrared surveys, optical interferometric imaging, and development of virtual observatory capabilities. Prince chaired the consortium that developed the Intel Touchstone Delta, one of the early large-scale general-purpose parallel computers. He was also one of the initiators of the US National Virtual Observatory.

Starting in the late 1990s, Prince began to work on development of techniques for detection of gravitational waves from neutron star and black hole systems. He was NASA Mission Scientist and chair of the US science team for the Laser Interferometer Space Antenna (LISA) and was earlier a member of the ground-based Laser Interferometer Gravitational-wave Observatory (LIGO).

Most recently, Prince has been using the Palomar Transient Factory to carry out time-domain studies of astronomical sources, including ultra-compact binaries.

Among the positions that Prince has held are: associate director, Caltech Center for Advanced Computing Research (CACR); member of the National Research Council Commission on Physical Sciences, Mathematics, and applications; co-chair of the National Research Council Committee on Astronomy and Astrophysics; and chair of the NASA Gamma Ray Observatory Users' Committee.

He is also a Fellow of the American Physical Society and has received the NASA Distinguished Service Medal.

Prince is an avid amateur photographer, working in the near-infrared region of the spectrum.
