= Thomas Prince (footballer) =

English footballer

Personal information
- Full name: Thomas Prince
- Date of birth: 20 February 1879
- Place of birth: Hetton-le-Hole, England
- Date of death: 1950 (aged 70–71)
- Position: Winger

Senior career*
Years	Team	Apps	(Gls)
1896–1897	Selbourne		
1897–1901	Sunderland	4	(0)
- * Club domestic league appearances and goals

Thomas Prince (20 February 1879 – 1950) was an English professional footballer who played as a winger for Sunderland.
