= John F. Mustard =

Canadian planetary scientist

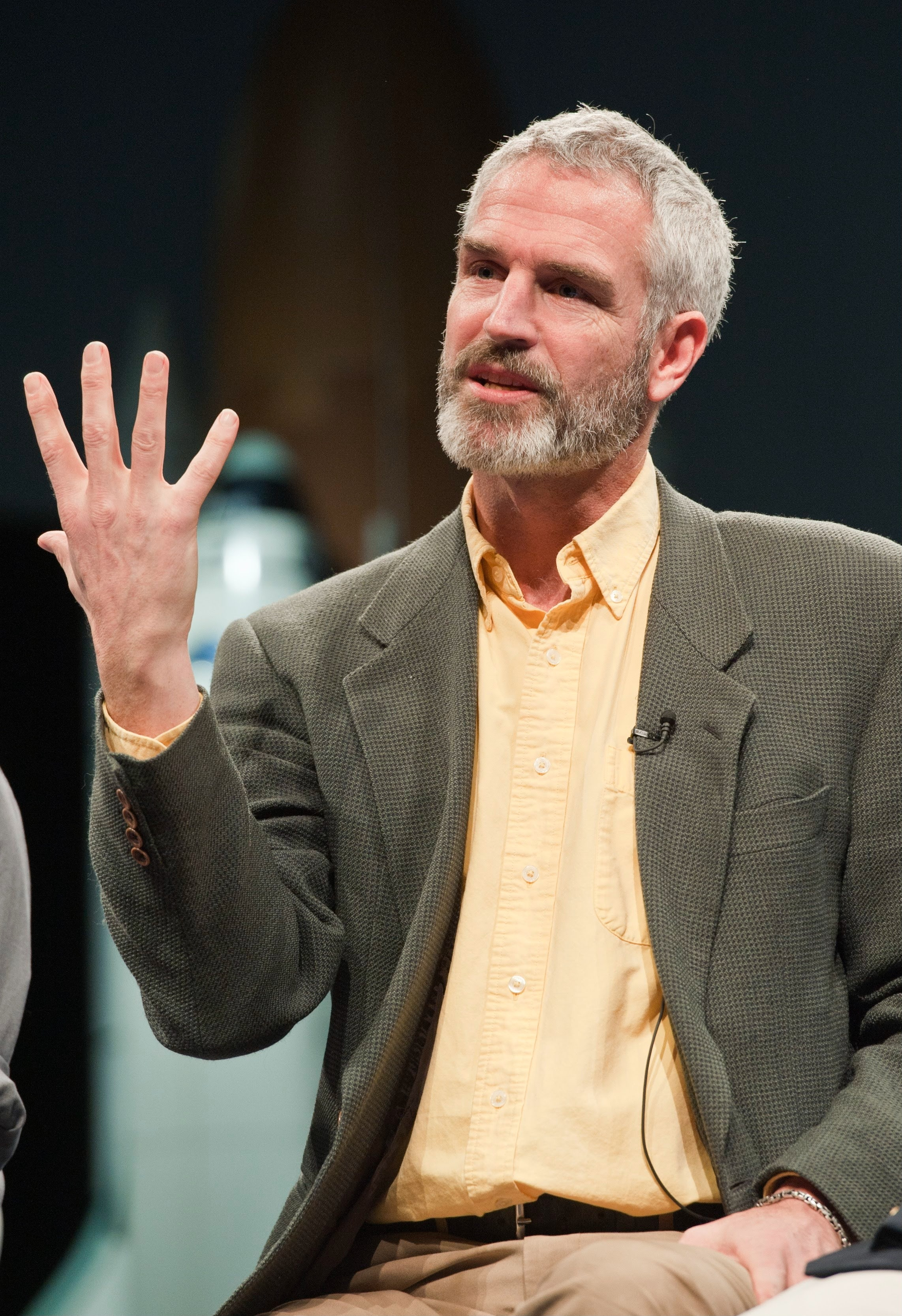
- Education: University of British Columbia; Brown University
- Scientific career
- Fields: Planetary science
- Workplaces: Brown University

John F. Mustard is a planetary scientist and professor of Earth, Environmental, and Planetary Sciences at Brown University. He specializes in using remote sensing and spectroscopy technology to examine and analyze planetary bodies. Mustard investigates the formation and evolution of rocky planets such as Mars, Mercury, the Moon and the Earth.

== Career ==
Mustard was initially fascinated with the work of marine biologists such as Jacques Cousteau, but he chose to study in earth sciences. He earned his B.Sc. in geology from the University of British Columbia in 1983, and continued his studies in the Department of Geological Sciences at Brown University obtaining an M.Sc. in 1986 and a Ph.D. in 1990. Shortly thereafter he became an assistant professor of research until joining regular faculty.

He was a founding member of the Environmental Change Initiative at Brown University in 2000, that has since become the Institute at Brown for Environment and Society (IBES). He has served on a number of departmental administrative, strategic and search committees and among his university service he has served on the Provost Search Committee (2014) and Academic Priorities Committee (2013-2019). He has served on NASA and National Academy of Sciences committees, most recently as a member of the Space Studies Board and as a member of the Mars Architecture Strategy Working group 2019-2020. He is currently Co-Director along with Barbara Sherwood Lollar (University of Toronto) of the Earth 4D program of the Canadian Institute for Advanced Research (CIFAR) and the Deputy Principal Investigator of the Compact Reconnaissance Imaging Spectrometer for Mars (CRISM) on the NASA Mars Reconnaissance Orbiter

== Mission involvement ==
• Earth Observer 1 (Science Team Member)

• OMEGA: Observatoire pour la Minéralogie, l’Eau, les Glaces et l’Activité (science collaborator)

• CRISM: Compact Reconnaissance Imaging Spectrometer for Mars (Deputy Principal Investigator)

• M3: Moon Mineralogy Mapper (Science Team Member)

== Honors ==
• Elected as a Fellow of the American Association for the Advancement of Science 2011

• Awarded the NASA Medal for Exceptional Public Service 2012

• Elected fellow of the American Geophysical Union 2014
