= Beacon mode service =

Spacecraft communications service

The beacon mode service is a Consultative Committee for Space Data Systems (CCSDS) telecommunications service aimed at spacecraft which are not communicated with (on a daily basis) via NASA's Deep Space Network. It is primarily designed to relay a spacecraft's "health" information, and secondarily its telecommunications status, using a simple signal that can be detected with a moderately-sized antenna. Beacon mode also enables spacecraft to communicate with one another on a daily basis, allowing for one spacecraft to act as a data proxy for another.

The CCSDS tone beacon mode configures the transceiver to transmit a CW tone. It can be used to signal other spacecraft to transmit their data to an orbiter; however, its primary function is to transmit spacecraft health information. Addressing multiple spacecraft is accomplished by using four unique CW frequencies with 16 possible tones, used somewhat like DTMF signaling technology. In the outer solar system, UHF frequencies are not used; instead, the primary (or backup) transmitter is programmed to transmit the required tone (generally in the X or Ku band). Spacecraft may respond in any transmit configuration compatible with valid orbiter receive configurations, but outside the beacon mode service.

== History ==
The beacon mode service is a new technological solution to the old problem of having to set up an active 2-way communication path with spacecraft beyond Earth orbit and more than 30 light-minutes away. It originated during the 1990s, when spacecraft transmitters became complex enough to support the service, and deep-space missions became too numerous for each to receive daily communications.

== Current practice ==
NASA generally prefers that missions use eight or fewer tones, as the New Horizons mission uses. CCSDS specifications support 16 beacon-mode tones, but this is to future proof the protocol.

Typical operating parameters:

Tone #

1. Test tone;
2. Nothing to report;
3. Ready to report;
4. Need help with a minor onboard problem;
5. Need help with an onboard problem that is hindering operations;
6. In safe mode due to a severe onboard problem.

== Craft using beacon mode ==
This list is incomplete, and does not cover geosynchronous craft:

- Deep Space 1 was the first spacecraft to use the service.
- New Horizons mission to Pluto, was used for its 6-plus years of cruise-mode operation.
- Mars Rovers, for daily data uplink notification to orbiters. Both(MER?)/all NASA Rovers are using the Proximity-1 Space Link Protocol to relay data to Earth and use beacon mode to signal that they have data to uplink.

Terminated missions which used the service:

- Phoenix – The Phoenix lander descended to Mars on May 25, 2008, and operated for some months.

== Civil and military use ==
There is no provision against civil telecommunications or military spacecraft using the beacon mode service; all CCSDS protocols are open to civilian and military use.

Some satellite telecom providers have used their own forms of beacon mode service on their own craft; however, the CCSDS standard may in time displace some homebrew versions of the technology which have been deployed in the space sector outside governmental space agencies.

== CCSDS frequency allocation ==
In deep-space service, the spacecraft's primary transmitter downlink frequency is used for the beacon mode service. However, for orbiter-lander missions there is a specific frequency allocation for the service.

The four orbiter-lander CW beacon mode frequencies for use with the Proximity-1 protocol are

- 437.1000 MHz
- 440.7425 MHz
- 444.3850 MHz
- 448.0275 MHz

The lander CW beacon frequency is 401.585625 MHz.

The beacon mode can also be used to perform Doppler ranging measurements.

== See also ==
- Radio astronomy
- Satellite communications
