= Peter Smith (physicist) =

Physicist from the United States

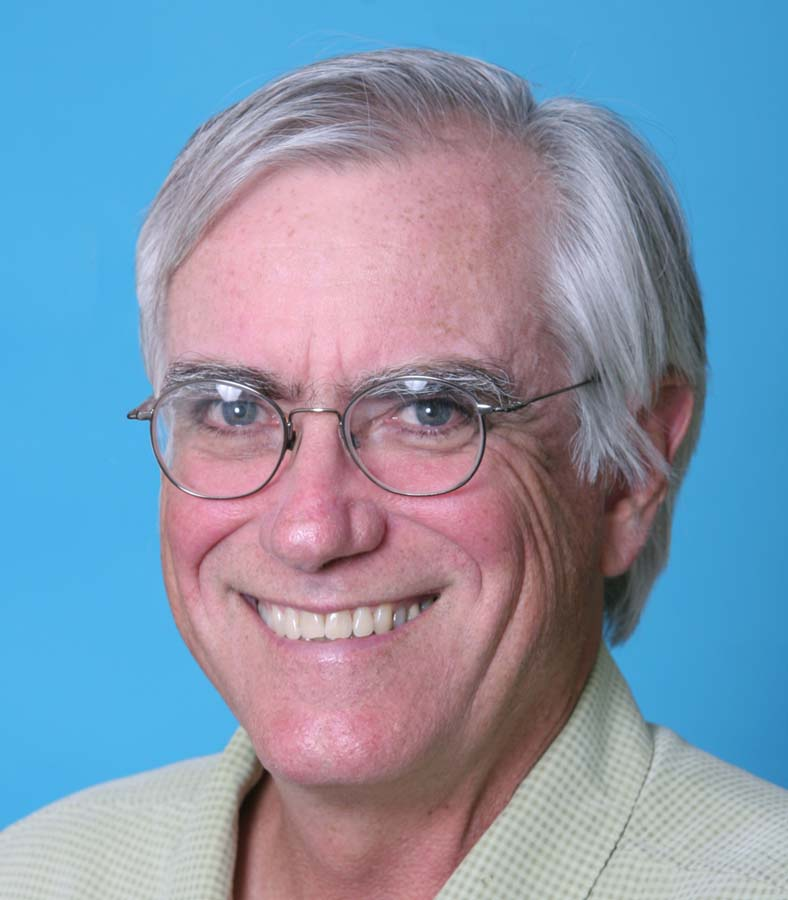
- Citizenship: American
- Education: University of California, Berkeley; University of Arizona
- Known for: Principal Investigator of Phoenix project
- Scientific career
- Fields: Physics
- Workplaces: University of Arizona, Lunar and Planetary Laboratory

Peter H. Smith is a professor emeritus (he retired in 2013) at the Lunar and Planetary Laboratory of the University of Arizona, where he holds the inaugural Thomas R. Brown Distinguished Chair in Integrative Science. He is also the principal investigator for the $420 million robotic explorer Phoenix which landed at the north pole of the planet Mars on May 25, 2008. Peter H. Smith's papers are held at the University of Arizona Special Collections Library.

== Early life and education ==
Peter H. Smith was born December 2, 1947, in New York and was raised in Tucson, Arizona. Smith's father was Hugh H. Smith, a virologist who was part of the team at the Rockefeller Foundation who developed a vaccine for yellow fever in 1930's. After his retirement from the Rockefeller Foundation, Hugh H. Smith worked at the University of Arizona and founded the Tucson Society of Tropical Medicine. Smith's mother was an opera singer.

Smith went to Tucson High School and received his bachelor's degree in physics in 1969 from the University of California, Berkeley and his master's degree from the University of Arizona Optical Sciences Center in 1977. In 2009 he received a PhD in Optical Science from the University of Arizona. Since 1978, he has worked at the University of Arizona Lunar and Planetary Laboratory, initially as a Research Assistant up the ladder to full professor with tenure.

== Space exploration missions ==
Smith worked on the Pioneer Venus mission of 1978 and the Pioneer Saturn mission of 1979, mapped the surface of Saturn's largest moon Titan using the Hubble Space Telescope in 1994, and became Project Manager for a descent camera on the Huygens probe that landed on Titan in 2005.

Smith designed the cameras for Sojourner Rover of the Mars Pathfinder mission, the ill-fated Mars Polar Lander, and the subsequently cancelled Mars Surveyor Lander. He helped to build the microscope for the ill-fated Beagle 2, and managed the building of the 2005 Mars Reconnaissance Orbiter HiRISE camera. He serves on the science team for the Mars Exploration Rovers which landed in January 2004.

Smith's proposal for the Phoenix Mars Lander project was selected in 2003 as the first Scout mission to Mars. He was responsible for all aspects of the $420 million mission.

At present, Smith is a co-investigator for the NASA New Frontiers OSIRIS-REx Mission.

== Awards ==
Smith has received many awards in his career including the NASA Exceptional Scientific Achievement Medal in 2010.
