= Green Valley (Mars) =

Region in the northern hemisphere of Mars; landing site of NASA's Phoenix lander

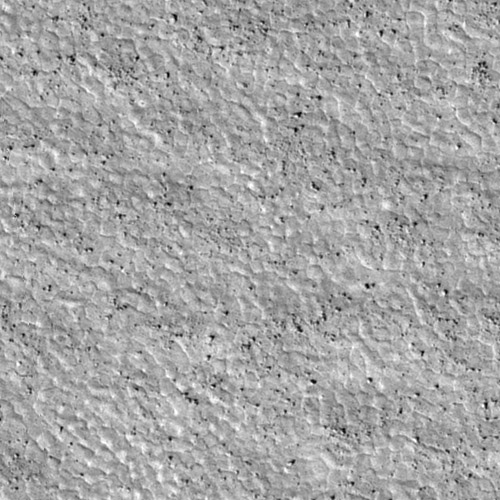
- HiRISE image of a patch of land in the Green Valley region showing scattered small boulders and a polygonal fracture pattern.
- Coordinates: 68.35°N 233°E
- Naming: Informal name based on danger assessment map color

Green Valley is a region on Mars within Vastitas Borealis that was chosen as the landing site of NASA's Phoenix lander. It is located at 68.35 degrees north, 233 degrees east. The valley is about 50 kilometres wide, but only about 250 metres deep; either it was filled in, or was never any deeper than that. The edges are not visible from the middle of the valley.

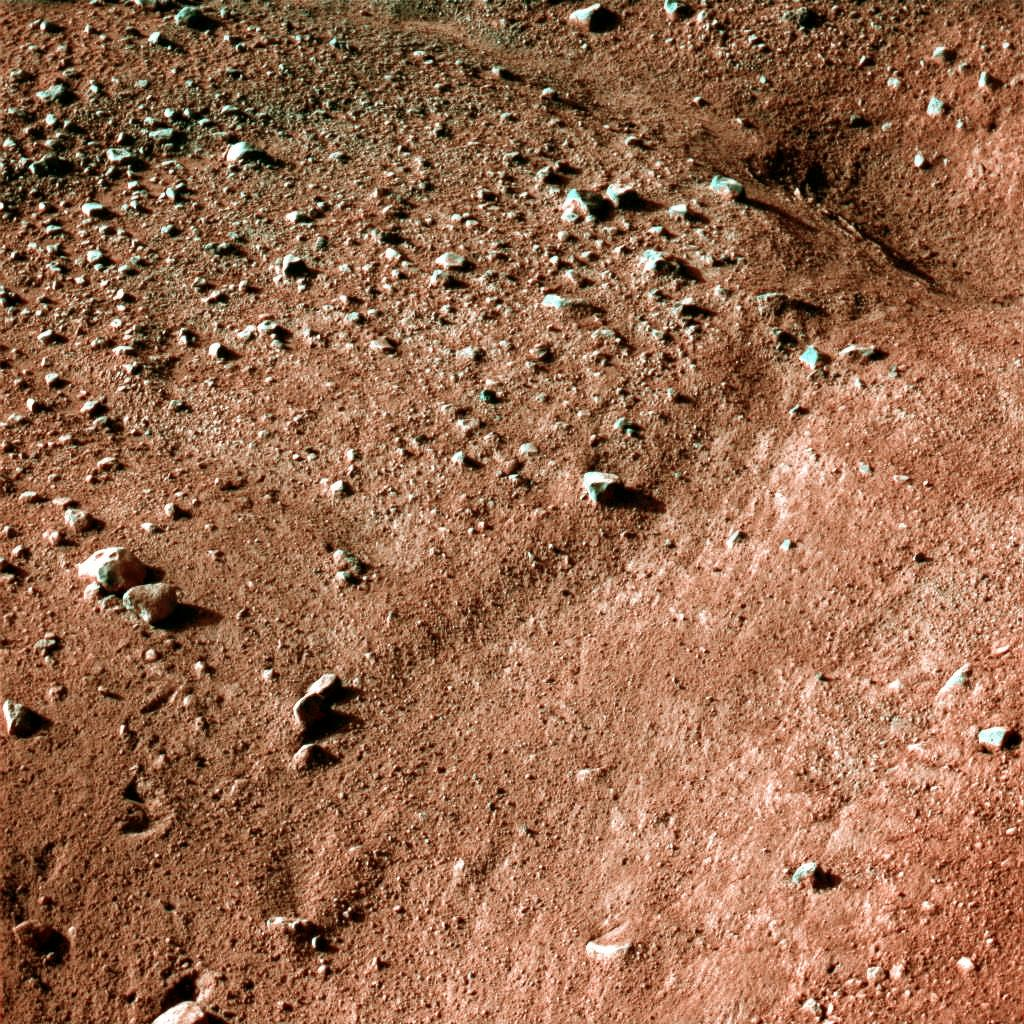
Polygonal patterns at Phoenix landing site

The name "Green Valley" is not officially recognised by the International Astronomical Union. It came from the decision process by which it was selected as Phoenix's landing site: prospective landing areas were color-coded based on how hazardous they were, with red being most hazardous through yellow to green being the safest. Green Valley has relatively few of the large boulders that could have tipped the lander if it had hit one during touchdown.

The ground within Green Valley is covered with polygonal features several metres across and roughly ten centimetres high, thought to be caused either by thermal contraction (ice-wedge polygons) or by the effects of wind-blown dust (sand-wedge polygons). Water ice is thought to be just below the surface. During the local winter as much as three feet of carbon dioxide ice is expected to appear on the surface.

Shortly before Phoenix's scheduled landing, the Mars Reconnaissance Orbiter photographed a pair of kilometer-tall dust devils in the Green Valley area.
