= Heimdal (crater) =

Crater on Mars

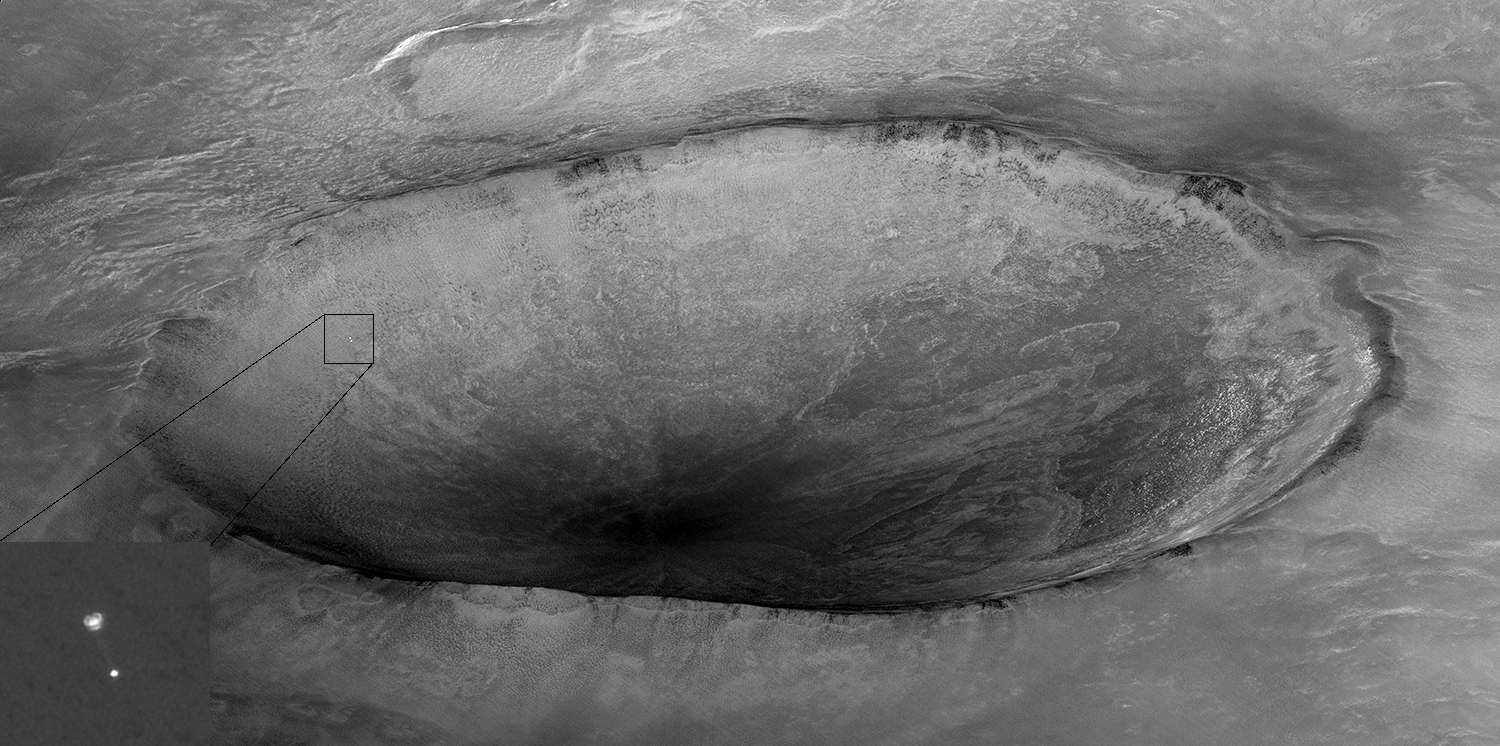
- Heimdal photographed by MRO, with the Phoenix lander parachuting down to a landing nearby.
- Planet: Mars
- Coordinates: 68.3°N 235.3°E
- Quadrangle: Mare Boreum
- Diameter: 10 km
- Eponym: The Norwegian town of Heimdal

Heimdal is a relatively recent impact crater on the planet Mars. It is a simple crater which lies in Vastitas Borealis, the northern plain. It is named after the Norwegian town of Heimdal.

The crater is approximately 20 kilometers from the landing site of the Phoenix lander. The landing site area is believed to be blanketed by ejecta excavated by the impact that created Heimdal, approximately 600 million years ago. The spacecraft was photographed during landing by the Mars Reconnaissance Orbiter, and was captured parachuting in the line of sight to the crater. While appearing to be over the crater, the craft was actually 20 km in front of it.
