= Phoenix (spacecraft) =

NASA Mars lander

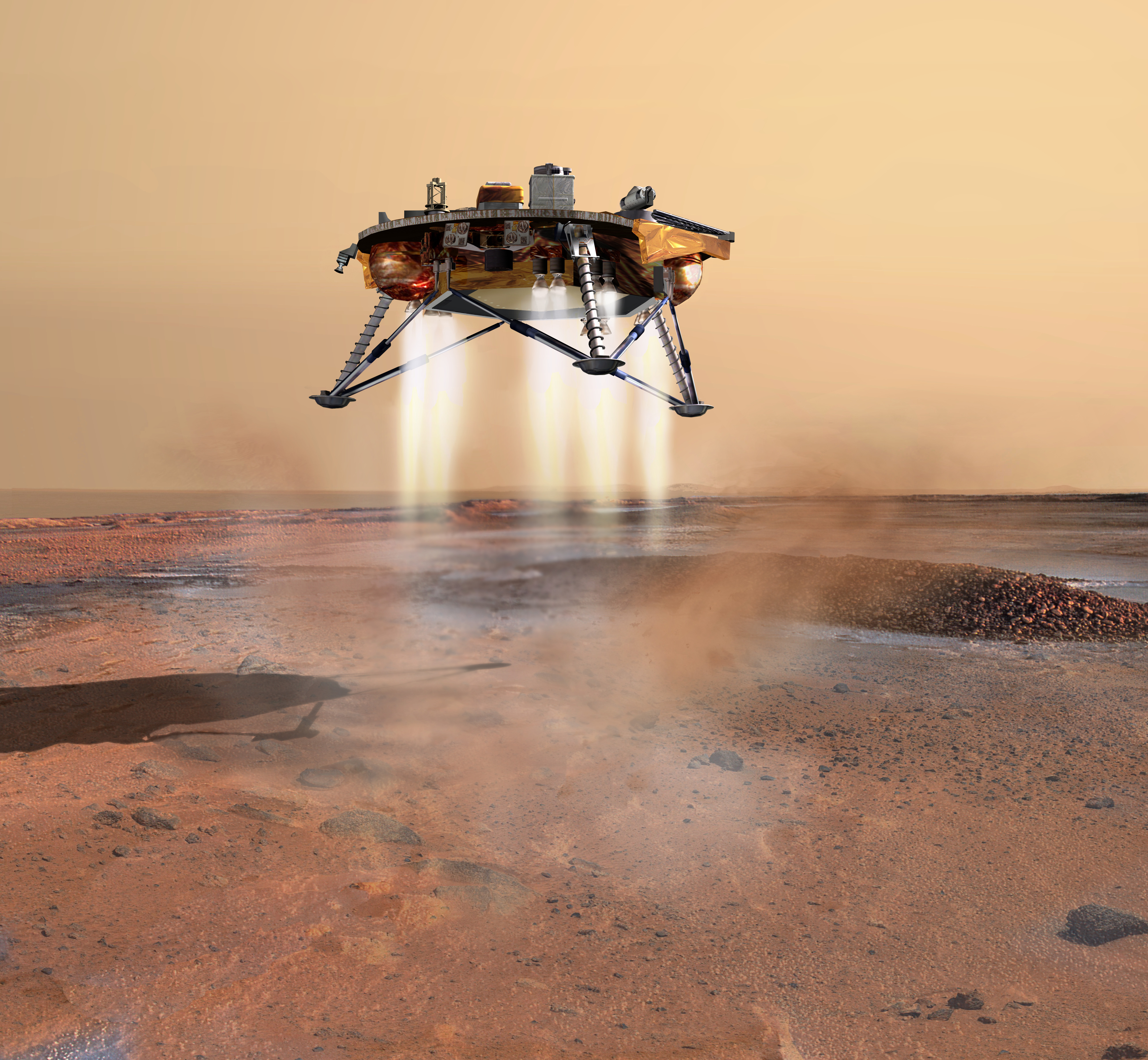
- Artist's impression of the Phoenix spacecraft as it lands on Mars.
- Mission type: Stationary lander
- Operator: NASA; JPL; University of Arizona
- COSPAR ID: 2007-034A
- SATCAT no.: 32003
- Website: phoenix.lpl.arizona.edu
- Mission duration: 90 martian sols (planned); 157 martian sols (actual); 1 year, 2 months, 29 days (launch to last contact)

Spacecraft properties
- Manufacturer: Lockheed Martin Space Systems
- Launch mass: 670 kg (1,477 lb.)
- Landing mass: 350 kg (770 lb)
- Power: 450W, Solar array / NiH_{2} battery

Start of mission
- Launch date: August 4, 2007 09:26 UTC (19 years, 3 months and 18 days ago)
- Rocket: Delta II 7925
- Launch site: Cape Canaveral SLC-17
- Contractor: Lockheed Martin Space Systems

End of mission
- Declared: May 24, 2010
- Last contact: November 2, 2008 (18 years and 20 days ago)

Mars lander
- Landing date: May 25, 2008 23:53:44 UTC; MSD 47777 01:02 AMT; MSD 47776 16:35 LMST (Sol 0) (18 years, 5 months and 25 days ago)
- Landing site: Green Valley, Vastitas Borealis, Mars; 68.2188°N 125.7492°W
Instruments
- RA: Robotic arm
- RAC: Robotic Arm Camera
- TEGA: Thermal and Evolved Gas Analyzer
- MARDI: Mars Descent Imager
- MET: Meteorological station
- SSI: Surface Stereo Imager
- MECA: Microscopy, Electrochemistry, and Conductivity Analyzer
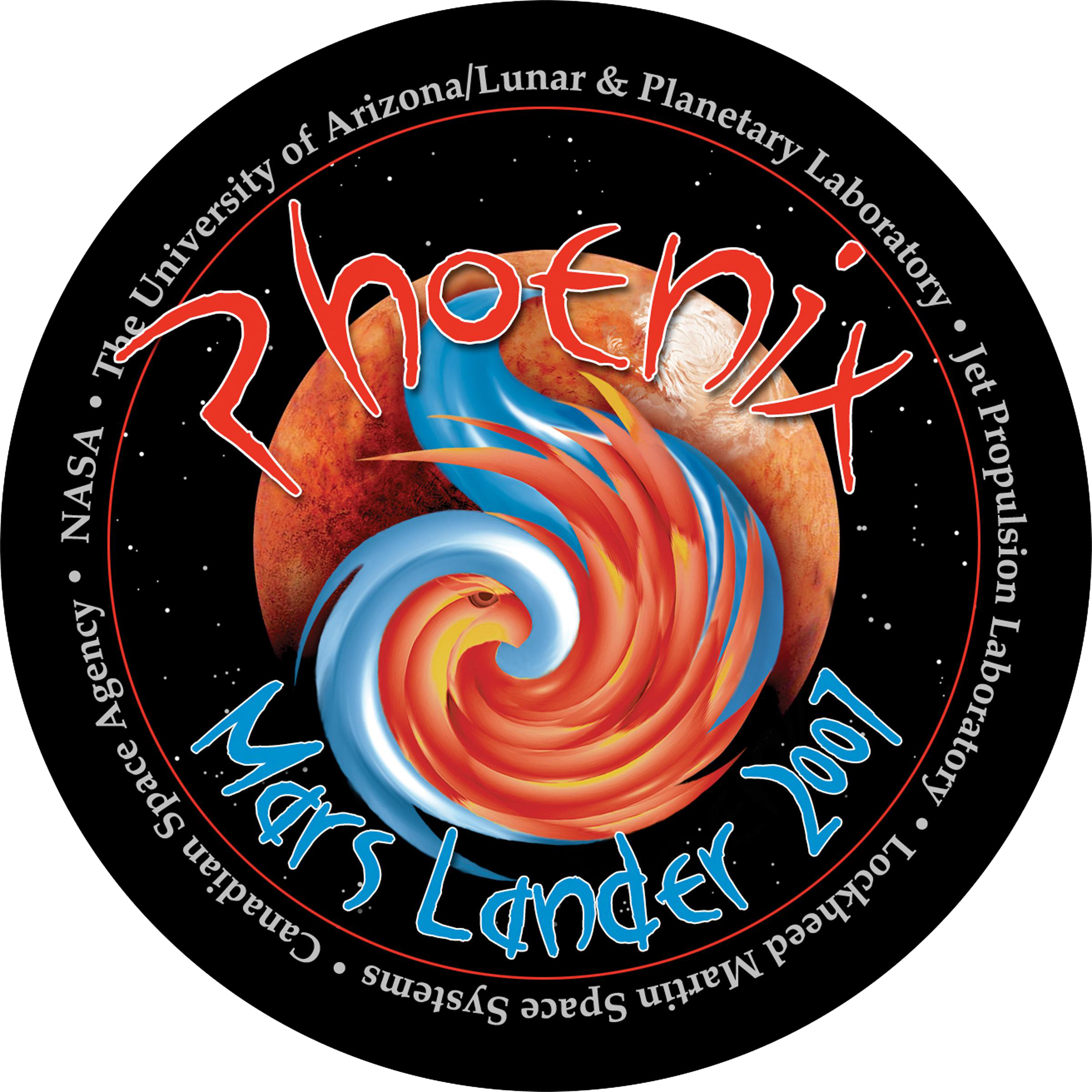
- Phoenix Mars Lander mission logo Mars Exploration Program

Phoenix was an uncrewed space probe that landed on the surface of Mars on May 25, 2008, and operated until November 2, 2008. Phoenix was operational on Mars for 157 sols (161 days). Its instruments were used to assess the local habitability and to research the history of water on Mars. The mission was part of the Mars Scout Program; its total cost was $420 million, including the cost of launch.

The multi-agency program was led by the Lunar and Planetary Laboratory at the University of Arizona, with project management by NASA's Jet Propulsion Laboratory. Academic and industrial partners included universities in the United States, Canada, Switzerland, Denmark, Germany, the United Kingdom, NASA, the Canadian Space Agency, the Finnish Meteorological Institute, Lockheed Martin Space Systems, MacDonald Dettwiler & Associates (MDA) in partnership with Optech Incorporated (Optech) and other aerospace companies. It was the first NASA mission to Mars led by a public university.

Phoenix was NASA's sixth successful landing on Mars, from seven attempts, and the first in Mars's polar region. The lander completed its mission in August 2008, and made a last brief communication with Earth on November 2 as available solar power dropped with the Martian winter. The mission was declared concluded on November 10, 2008, after engineers were unable to re-contact the craft. After unsuccessful attempts to contact the lander by the Mars Odyssey orbiter up to and past the Martian summer solstice on May 12, 2010, JPL declared the lander to be dead. The program was considered a great success because it completed all planned science experiments and observations.

== Mission overview ==
The mission had two goals. One was to study the geological history of water, the key to unlocking the story of past climate change. The second was to evaluate past or potential planetary habitability in the ice-soil boundary. Phoenix's instruments were suitable for uncovering information on the geological and possibly biological history of the Martian Arctic. Phoenix was the first mission to return data from either of the poles, and contributed to NASA's main strategy for Mars exploration, "Follow the water."

The primary mission was anticipated to last 90 sols (Martian days)—just over 92 Earth days. However, the craft exceeded its expected operational lifetime by a little over two months before succumbing to the increasing cold and dark of an advancing Martian winter. Researchers had hoped that the lander would survive into the Martian winter so that it could witness polar ice developing around it – perhaps up to 1 meter (3 ft) of solid carbon dioxide ice could have appeared. Even had it survived some of the winter, the intense cold would have prevented it from lasting all the way through. The mission was chosen to be a fixed lander rather than a rover because:

- costs were reduced through reuse of earlier equipment (though this claim is disputed by some observers);
- the area of Mars where Phoenix landed is thought to be relatively uniform, thus traveling on the surface is of less value; and
- the weight budget needed for mobility could instead be used for more and better scientific instruments.

The 2003–2004 observations of methane gas on Mars were made remotely by three teams working with separate data. If the methane is truly present in the atmosphere of Mars, then something must be producing it on the planet now, because the gas is broken down by radiation on Mars within 300 years; therefore, it was considered important to determine the biological potential or habitability of the Martian arctic's soils. Methane could also be the product of a geochemical process or the result of volcanic or hydrothermal activity.

=== History ===
While the proposal for Phoenix was being written, the Mars Odyssey orbiter used its gamma-ray spectrometer and found the distinctive signature of hydrogen on some areas of the Martian surface, and the only plausible source of hydrogen on Mars would be water in the form of ice, frozen below the surface. The mission was therefore funded on the expectation that Phoenix would find water ice on the arctic plains of Mars. In August 2003 NASA selected the University of Arizona "Phoenix" mission for launch in 2007. It was hoped this would be the first in a new line of smaller, low-cost, Scout missions in the agency's exploration of Mars program. The selection was the result of an intense two-year competition with proposals from other institutions. The $325 million NASA award is more than six times larger than any other single research grant in University of Arizona history.

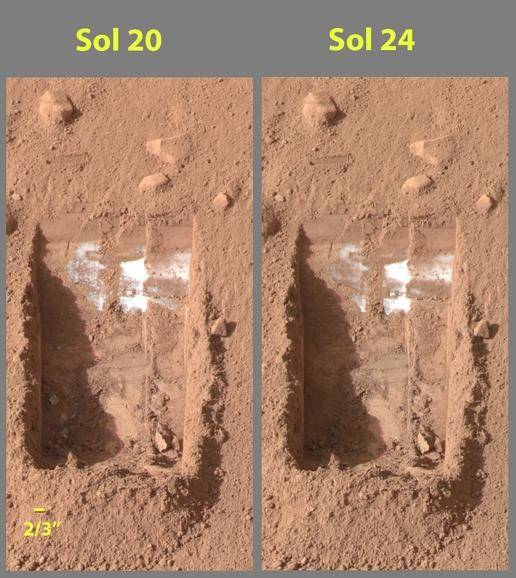
Side-by-side images of a trench dug by Phoenix's robotic arm, showing the sublimation of material – three whitish clumps in the lower left corner of the trench – presumed to be water ice, over the course of four days (Sol 20 to Sol 24).

Peter H. Smith of the University of Arizona Lunar and Planetary Laboratory, as Principal Investigator, along with 24 Co-Investigators, were selected to lead the mission. The mission was named after the Phoenix, a mythological bird that is repeatedly reborn from its own ashes. The Phoenix spacecraft contains several previously built components. The lander used was the modified Mars Surveyor 2001 Lander (canceled in 2000), along with several of the instruments from both that and the previous unsuccessful Mars Polar Lander mission. Lockheed Martin, who built the lander, had kept the nearly complete lander in an environmentally controlled clean room from 2001 until the mission was funded by the NASA Scout Program.

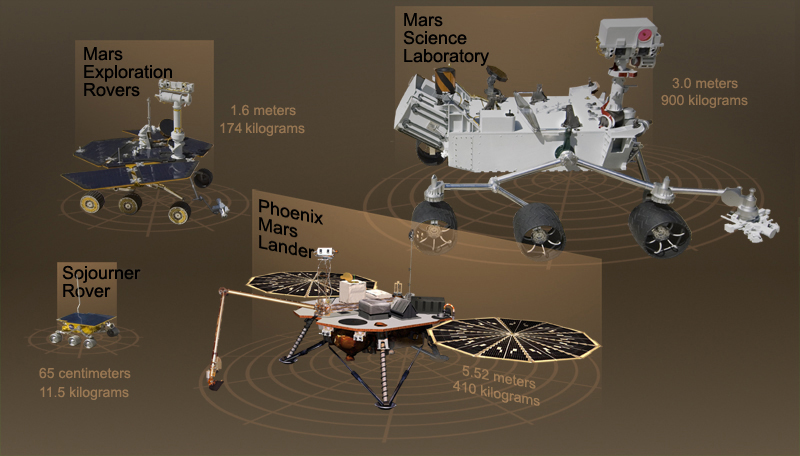
A comparison of sizes for the Sojourner rover, the Mars Exploration Rovers, the Phoenix lander and the Mars Science Laboratory.

Phoenix was a partnership of universities, NASA centers, and the aerospace industry. The science instruments and operations were a University of Arizona responsibility. NASA's Jet Propulsion Laboratory in Pasadena, California, managed the project and provided mission design and control. Lockheed Martin Space Systems built and tested the spacecraft. The Canadian Space Agency provided a meteorological station, including an innovative laser-based atmospheric sensor. The co-investigator institutions included Malin Space Science Systems (California), Max Planck Institute for Solar System Research (Germany), NASA Ames Research Center (California), NASA Johnson Space Center (Texas), MacDonald, Dettwiler and Associates (Canada), Optech Incorporated (Canada), SETI Institute, Texas A&M University, Tufts University, University of Colorado, University of Copenhagen (Denmark), University of Michigan, University of Neuchâtel (Switzerland), University of Texas at Dallas, University of Washington, Washington University in St. Louis, and York University (Canada). Scientists from Imperial College London and the University of Bristol provided hardware for the mission and were part of the team operating the microscope station.

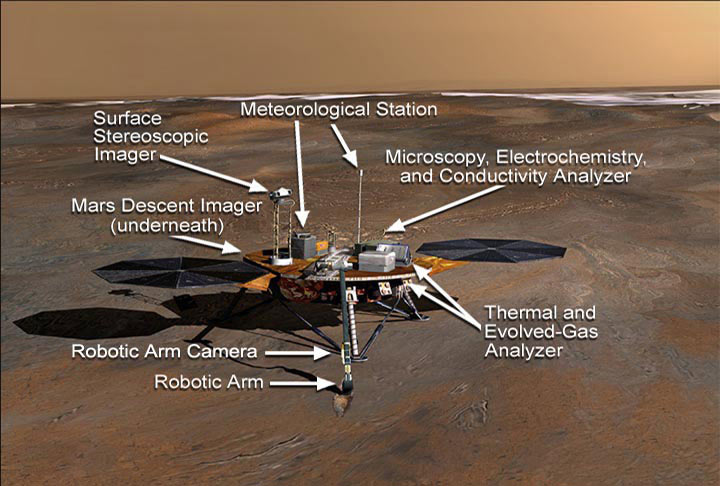
A labeled look at NASA's Phoenix Mars lander.

On June 2, 2005, following a critical review of the project's planning progress and preliminary design, NASA approved the mission to proceed as planned. The purpose of the review was to confirm NASA's confidence in the mission.

=== Specifications ===
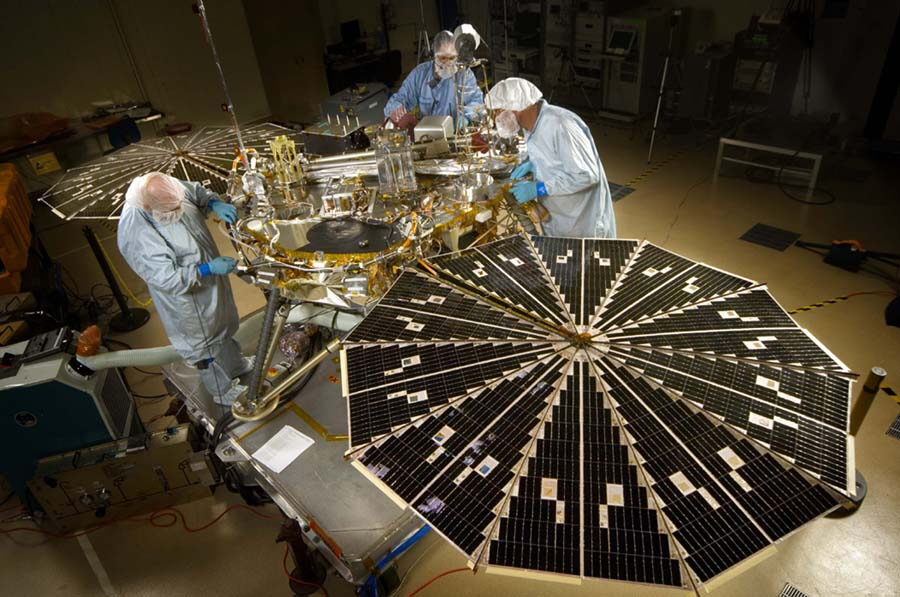
Phoenix during testing in September 2006

Launched mass
670 kg (1,480 lb) Includes Lander, Aeroshell (backshell and heatshield), parachutes, cruise stage.
Lander Mass
350 kg (770 lb)
Lander Dimensions
About 5.5 m (18 ft) long with the solar panels deployed. The science deck by itself is about 1.5 m (4.9 ft) in diameter. From the ground to the top of the MET mast, the lander measures about 2.2 m (7.2 ft) tall.
Communications
X-band throughout the cruise phase of the mission and for its initial communication after separating from the third stage of the launch vehicle. UHF links, relayed through Mars orbiters during the entry, descent and landing phase and while operating on the surface of Mars. The UHF system on Phoenix is compatible with relay capabilities of NASA's Mars Odyssey, Mars Reconnaissance Orbiter and with the European Space Agency's Mars Express. The interconnections use the Proximity-1 protocol.
Power
Power for the cruise phase is generated using two decagonal gallium arsenide solar panels (total area 3.1 m^{2} (33 ft^{2})) mounted to the cruise stage, and for the lander, via two gallium arsenide solar array panels (total area 7.0 m^{2} (75 ft^{2})) deployed from the lander after touchdown on the Martian surface. NiH_{2} battery with a capacity of 16 A·h.

Lander systems include a RAD6000 based computer system for commanding the spacecraft and handling data. Other parts of the lander are an electrical system containing solar arrays and batteries, a guidance system to land the spacecraft, eight 4.4 N (1.0 lbf) and 22 N (5.0 lbf) monopropellant hydrazine engines built by Aerojet-Redmond Operations for the cruise phase, twelve 302 N (68.0 lbf) Aerojet monopropellant hydrazine thrusters to land the Phoenix, mechanical and structural elements, and a heater system to ensure the spacecraft does not get too cold.

== Scientific payload ==
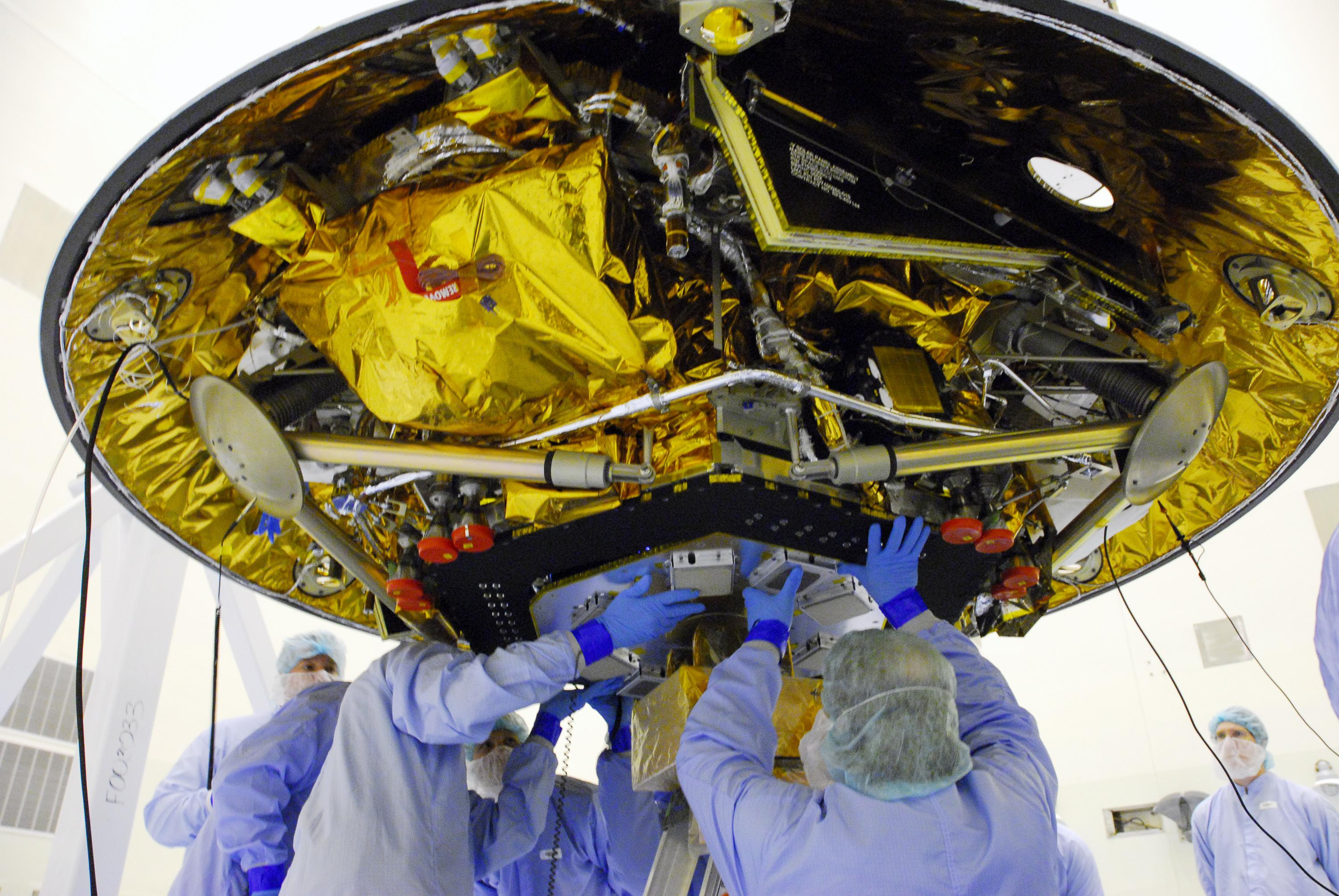
Phoenix Mars Lander being worked on by NASA engineers. The planned operational life of the Phoenix lander was 90 Martian days. Each Martian day is 40 minutes longer than an Earth Day.

Phoenix carried improved versions of University of Arizona panoramic cameras and volatiles-analysis instrument from the ill-fated Mars Polar Lander, as well as experiments that had been built for the canceled Mars Surveyor 2001 Lander, including a JPL trench-digging robotic arm, a set of wet chemistry laboratories, and optical and atomic force microscopes. The science payload also included a descent imager and a suite of meteorological instruments.

During EDL, the Atmospheric Structure Experiment was conducted. This used accelerometer and gyroscope data recorded during the lander's descent through the atmosphere to create a vertical profile of the temperature, pressure, and density of the atmosphere above the landing site, at that point in time.

=== Robotic arm and camera ===
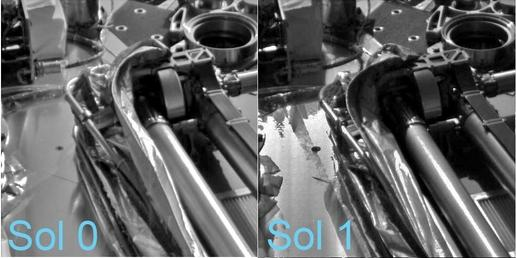
The robotic digging arm. Left: at landing, with covering in place. Right: the next day, with covering pushed aside.

The robotic arm was designed to extend 2.35 m (7.7 ft) from its base on the lander, and had the ability to dig down to 0.5 m (1.6 ft) below a sandy surface. It took samples of dirt and ice that were analyzed by other instruments on the lander. The arm was designed and built for the Jet Propulsion Laboratory by Alliance Spacesystems, LLC (now Maxar Space Robotics, LLC) in Pasadena, California. A rotating rasp-tool located in the heel of the scoop was used to cut into the strong permafrost. Cuttings from the rasp were ejected into the heel of the scoop and transferred to the front for delivery to the instruments. The rasp tool was conceived of at the Jet Propulsion Laboratory. The flight version of the rasp was designed and built by HoneyBee Robotics. Commands were sent for the arm to be deployed on May 28, 2008, beginning with the pushing aside of a protective covering intended to serve as a redundant precaution against potential contamination of Martian soil by Earthly life-forms. The Robotic Arm Camera (RAC) attached to the robotic arm just above the scoop was able to take full-color pictures of the area, as well as verify the samples that the scoop returned, and examined the grains of the area where the robotic arm had just dug. The camera was made by the University of Arizona and Max Planck Institute for Solar System Research, Germany.

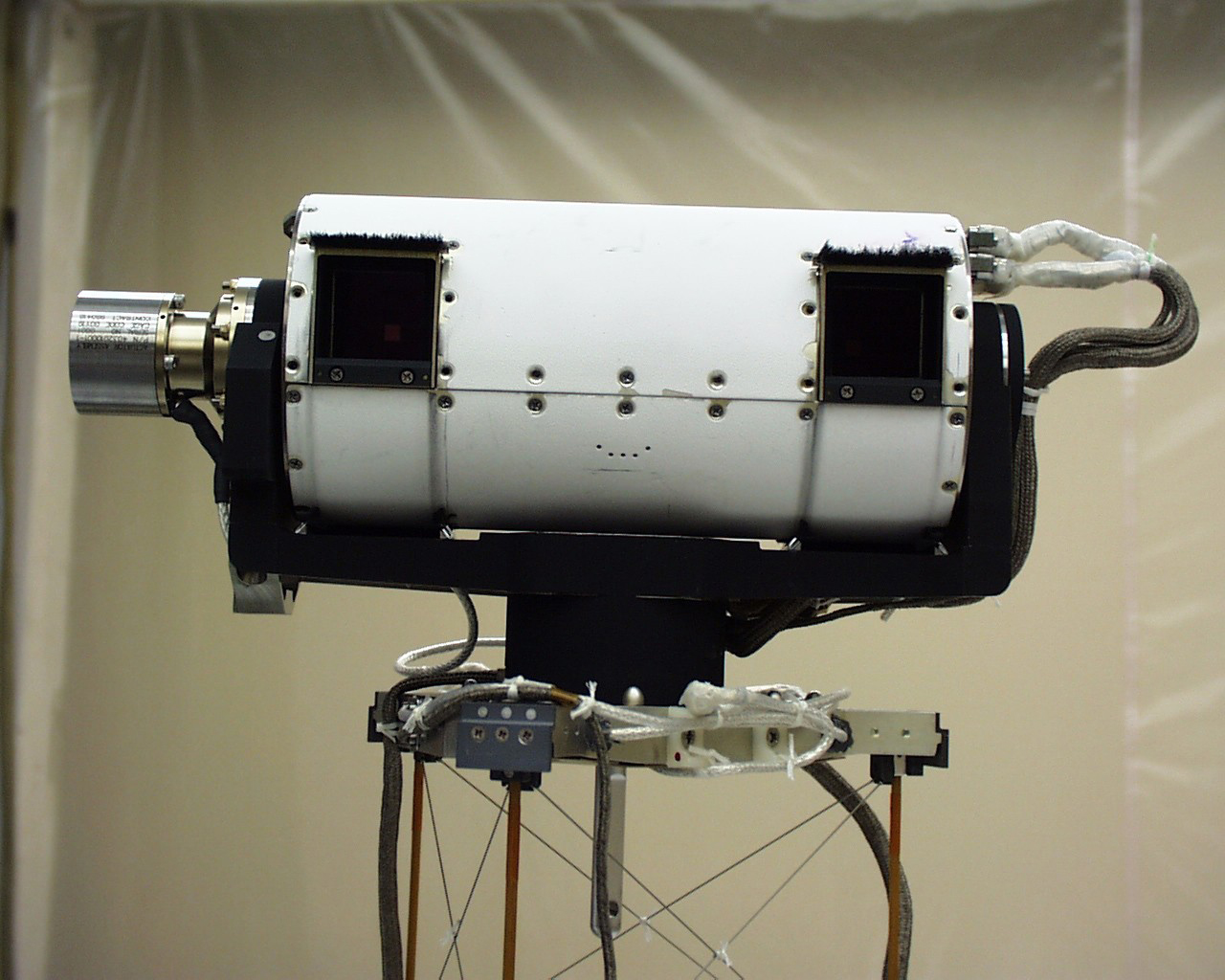
Surface Stereo Imager (SSI) built by the University of Arizona.

=== Surface stereo imager ===
The Surface Stereo Imager (SSI) was the primary camera on the lander. It is a stereo camera that is described as "a higher resolution upgrade of the imager used for Mars Pathfinder and the Mars Polar Lander". It took several stereo images of the Martian Arctic, and also used the Sun as a reference to measure the atmospheric distortion of the Martian atmosphere due to dust, air and other features. The camera was provided by the University of Arizona in collaboration with the Max Planck Institute for Solar System Research.

=== Thermal and evolved gas analyzer ===
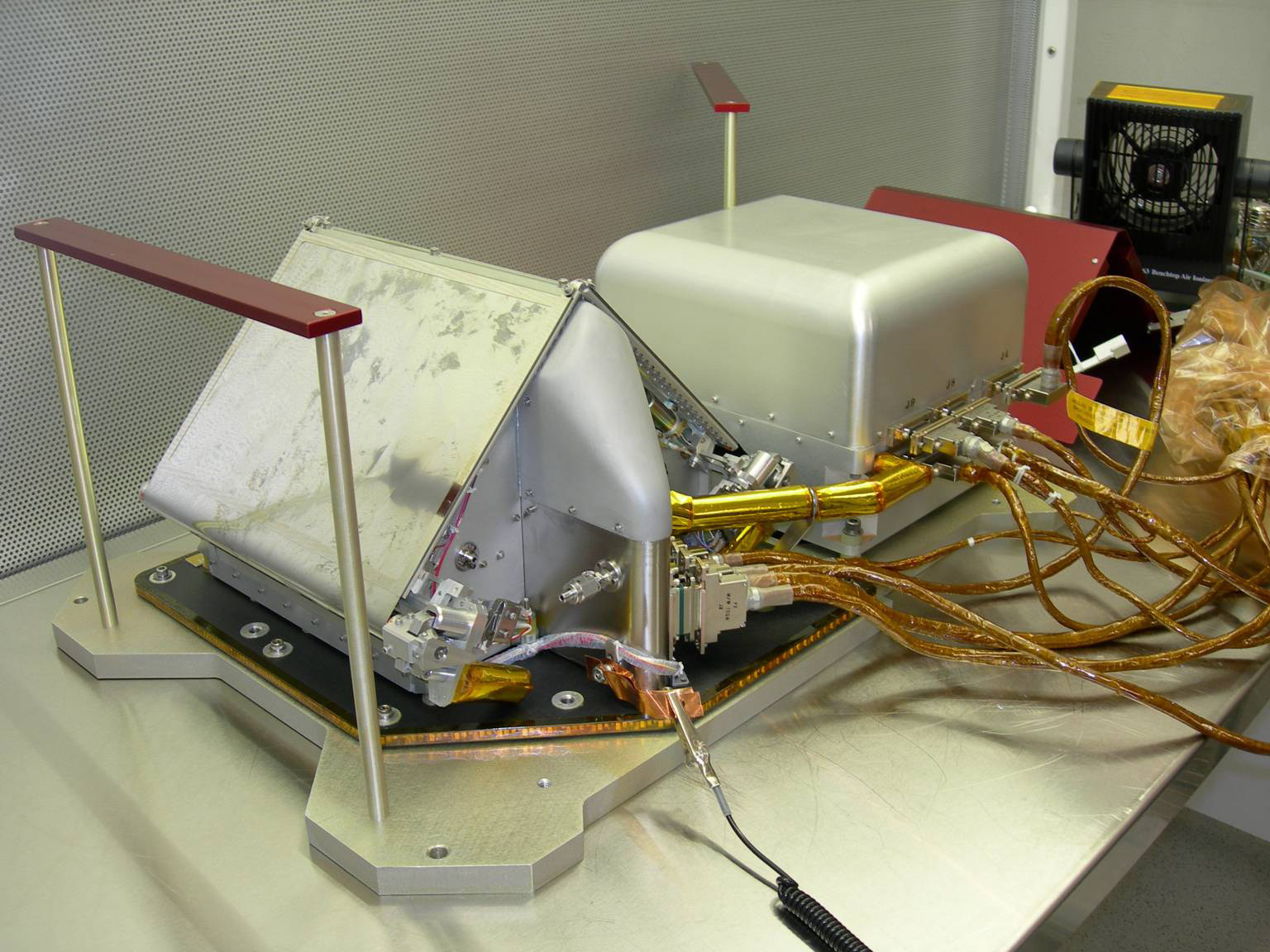
Thermal and Evolved Gas Analyzer

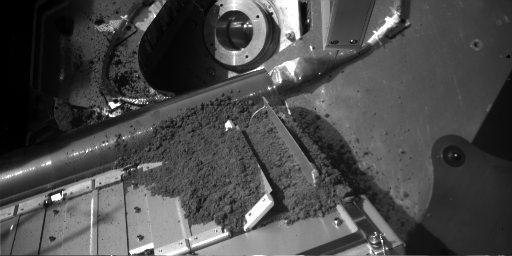
Martian soil being delivered to TEGA

The Thermal and Evolved Gas Analyzer (TEGA) is a combination of a high-temperature furnace with a differential scanning calorimeter and a mass spectrometer. It was used to bake samples of Martian dust and determine the composition of the resulting vapors. It has eight ovens, each about the size of a large ball-point pen, which were able to analyze one sample each, for a total of eight separate samples. Team members measured how much water vapor and carbon dioxide gas were given off, how much water ice the samples contained, and what minerals are present that may have formed during a wetter, warmer past climate. The instrument also measured organic volatiles, such as methane, down to 10 parts per billion. TEGA was built by the University of Arizona and University of Texas at Dallas. Soil was delivered to TEGA by the lander's robotic arm and scoop.

On May 29, 2008 (sol 4), electrical tests indicated an intermittent short circuit in TEGA, resulting from a glitch in one of the two filaments responsible for ionizing volatiles. NASA worked around the problem by configuring the backup filament as the primary and vice versa.

In early June, first attempts to get soil into TEGA were unsuccessful as it seemed too "cloddy" for the screens. On June 11 the first of the eight ovens was filled with a soil sample after several tries to get the soil sample through the screen of TEGA. On June 17, it was announced that no water was found in this sample; however, since it had been exposed to the atmosphere for several days prior to entering the oven, any initial water ice it might have contained could have been lost via sublimation.

=== Mars Descent Imager ===
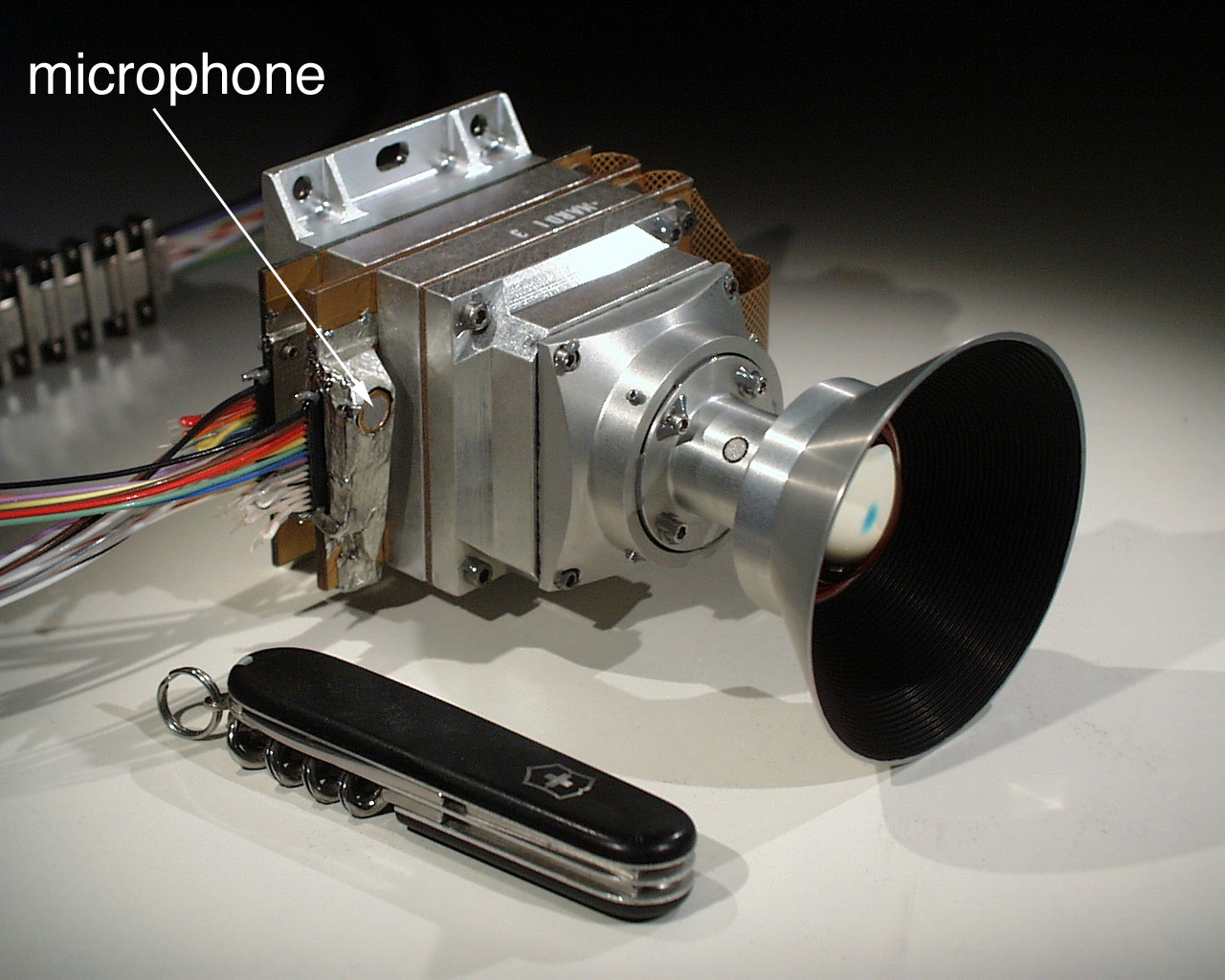
Mars Descent Imager built by Malin Space Science Systems.

The Mars Descent Imager (MARDI) was intended to take pictures of the landing site during the last three minutes of descent. As originally planned, it would have begun taking pictures after the aeroshell departed, about 8 km (5.0 mi) above the Martian soil.

Before launch, testing of the assembled spacecraft uncovered a potential data corruption problem with an interface card that was designed to route MARDI image data as well as data from various other parts of the spacecraft. The potential problem could occur if the interface card were to receive a MARDI picture during a critical phase of the spacecraft's final descent, at which point data from the spacecraft's Inertial Measurement Unit could have been lost; this data was critical to controlling the descent and landing. This was judged to be an unacceptable risk, and it was decided to not use MARDI during the mission. As the flaw was discovered too late for repairs, the camera remained installed on Phoenix but it was not used to take pictures, nor was its built-in microphone used.

MARDI images had been intended to help pinpoint exactly where the lander landed, and possibly help find potential science targets. It was also to be used to learn if the area where the lander lands is typical of the surrounding terrain. MARDI was built by Malin Space Science Systems. It would have used only 3 watts of power during the imaging process, less than most other space cameras. It had originally been designed and built to perform the same function on the Mars Surveyor 2001 Lander mission; after that mission was canceled, MARDI spent several years in storage until it was deployed on the Phoenix lander.

=== Microscopy, electrochemistry, and conductivity analyzer ===
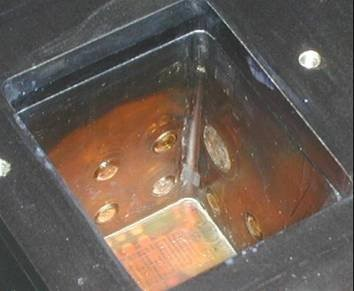
A prototype wet chemistry beaker showing some of the electrochemistry sensors on the sides of the beaker.

The Microscopy, Electrochemistry, and Conductivity Analyzer (MECA) is an instrument package originally designed for the canceled Mars Surveyor 2001 Lander mission. It consists of a wet chemistry lab (WCL), optical and atomic force microscopes, and a thermal and electrical conductivity probe. The Jet Propulsion Laboratory built MECA. A Swiss consortium led by the University of Neuchatel contributed the atomic force microscope.

Using MECA, researchers examined soil particles as small as 16 μm across; additionally, they attempted to determine the chemical composition of water-soluble ions in the soil. They also measured electrical and thermal conductivity of soil particles using a probe on the robotic arm scoop.

==== Sample wheel and translation stage ====
This instrument presents 6 of 69 sample holders to an opening in the MECA instrument to which the robotic arm delivers the samples and then brings the samples to the optical microscope and the atomic force microscope. Imperial College London provided the microscope sample substrates.

==== Optical microscope ====
The optical microscope, designed by the University of Arizona, is capable of making images of the Martian regolith with a resolution of 256 pixels/mm or 16 micrometers/pixel. The field of view of the microscope is a 2 mm × 2 mm (0.079 in × 0.079 in) sample holder to which the robotic arm delivers the sample. The sample is illuminated either by 9 red, green and blue LEDs or by 3 LEDs emitting ultraviolet light. The electronics for the readout of the CCD chip are shared with the robotic arm camera which has an identical CCD chip.

==== Atomic force microscope ====
The atomic force microscope has access to a small area of the sample delivered to the optical microscope. The instrument scans over the sample with one of 8 silicon crystal tips and measures the repulsion of the tip from the sample. The maximum resolution is 0.1 micrometres. A Swiss consortium led by the University of Neuchatel contributed the atomic force microscope.

==== Wet Chemistry Laboratory (WCL) ====
Illustration of how the wet chemistry lab onboard Phoenix mixes a Martian soil sample with water

The wet chemistry lab (WCL) sensor assembly and leaching solution were designed and built by Thermo Fisher Scientific. The WCL actuator assembly was designed and built by Starsys Research in Boulder, Colorado. Tufts University developed the reagent pellets, barium ISE, and ASV electrodes, and performed the preflight characterization of the sensor array.

The robotic arm scooped up some soil and put it in one of four wet chemistry lab cells, where water was added, and, while stirring, an array of electrochemical sensors measured a dozen dissolved ions such as sodium, magnesium, calcium, and sulfate that leached out from the soil into the water. This provided information on the biological compatibility of the soil, both for possible indigenous microbes and for possible future Earth visitors.

All of the four wet chemistry labs were identical, each containing 26 chemical sensors and a temperature sensor. The polymer Ion Selective Electrodes (ISE) were able to determine the concentration of ions by measuring the change in electric potential across their ion-selective membranes as a function of concentration. Two gas sensing electrodes for oxygen and carbon dioxide worked on the same principle but with gas-permeable membranes. A gold micro-electrode array was used for the cyclic voltammetry and anodic stripping voltammetry. Cyclic voltammetry is a method to study ions by applying a waveform of varying potential and measuring the current–voltage curve. Anodic stripping voltammetry first deposits the metal ions onto the gold electrode with an applied potential. After the potential is reversed, the current is measured while the metals are stripped off the electrode.

==== Thermal and Electrical Conductivity Probe (TECP) ====
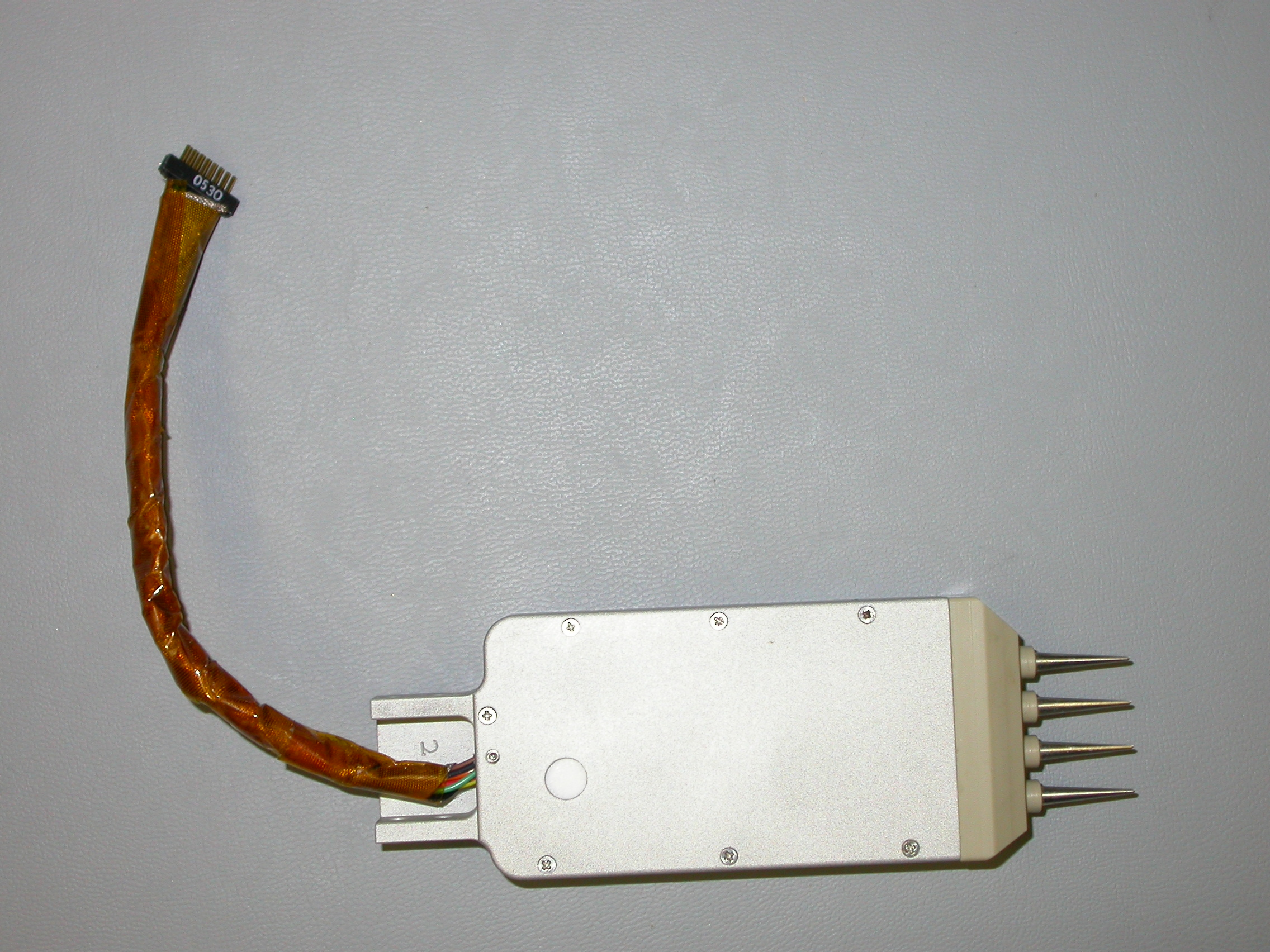
The Thermal and Electrical Conductivity Probe (TECP) with four metal sensing needles mounted in a plastic head.

The MECA contains a Thermal and Electrical Conductivity Probe (TECP). The TECP, designed by Decagon Devices, has four probes that made the following measurements: Martian soil temperature, relative humidity, thermal conductivity, electrical conductivity, dielectric permittivity, wind speed, and atmospheric temperature.

Three of the four probes have tiny heating elements and temperature sensors inside them. One probe uses internal heating elements to send out a pulse of heat, recording the time the pulse is sent and monitoring the rate at which the heat is dissipated away from the probe. Adjacent needles sense when the heat pulse arrives. The speed that the heat travels away from the probe as well as the speed that it travels between probes allows scientists to measure thermal conductivity, specific heat (the ability of the regolith to conduct heat relative to its ability to store heat) and thermal diffusivity (the speed at which a thermal disturbance is propagated in the soil).

The probes also measured the dielectric permittivity and electrical conductivity, which can be used to calculate moisture and salinity of the regolith. Needles 1 and 2 work in conjunction to measure salts in the regolith, heat the soil to measure thermal properties (thermal conductivity, specific heat and thermal diffusivity) of the regolith, and measure soil temperature. Needles 3 and 4 measure liquid water in the regolith. Needle 4 is a reference thermometer for needles 1 and 2.

The TECP humidity sensor is a relative humidity sensor, so it must be coupled with a temperature sensor in order to measure absolute humidity. Both the relative humidity sensor and a temperature sensor are attached directly to the circuit board of the TECP and are, therefore, assumed to be at the same temperature.

=== Meteorological station ===
The Meteorological Station (MET) recorded the daily weather of Mars during the course of the Phoenix mission. It is equipped with a wind indicator and pressure and temperature sensors. The MET also contains a lidar (light detection and ranging) device for sampling the number of dust particles in the air. It was designed in Canada by Optech and MDA, supported by the Canadian Space Agency. A team initially led by York University's Professor Diane Michelangeli until her death in 2007, when Professor James Whiteway took over, oversaw the science operations of the station. The York University team includes contributions from the University of Alberta, University of Aarhus (Denmark), Dalhousie University, Finnish Meteorological Institute, Optech, and the Geological Survey of Canada. Canadarm maker MacDonald Dettwiler and Associates (MDA) of Richmond, B.C. built the MET.

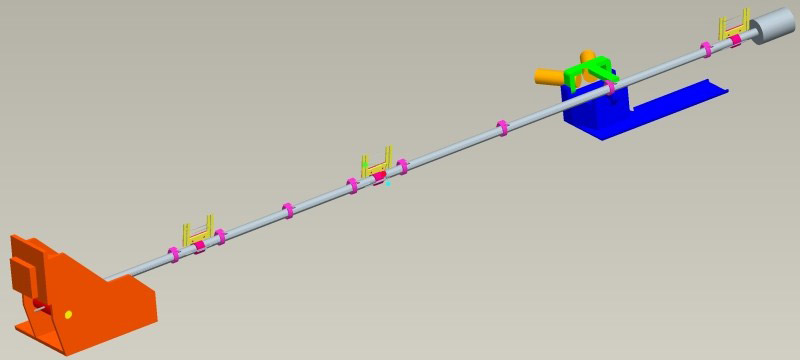
Meteorological Station (MET) built by the Canadian Space Agency.

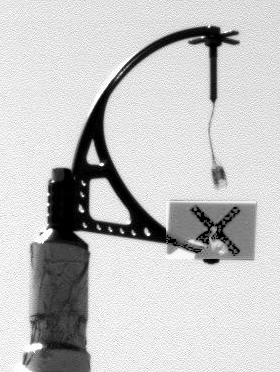
Phoenix deployed and then imaged the MET weather mast that holds the wind-strength and direction-measuring tell-tale at a height of 2.3 m. This enhanced image shows wind from the northeast on Sol 3.

The surface wind velocity, pressure, and temperature were also monitored over the mission (from the tell-tale, pressure, and temperature sensors) and show the evolution of the atmosphere with time. To measure dust and ice contribution to the atmosphere, a lidar was employed. The lidar collected information about the time-dependent structure of the planetary boundary layer by investigating the vertical distribution of dust, ice, fog, and clouds in the local atmosphere.

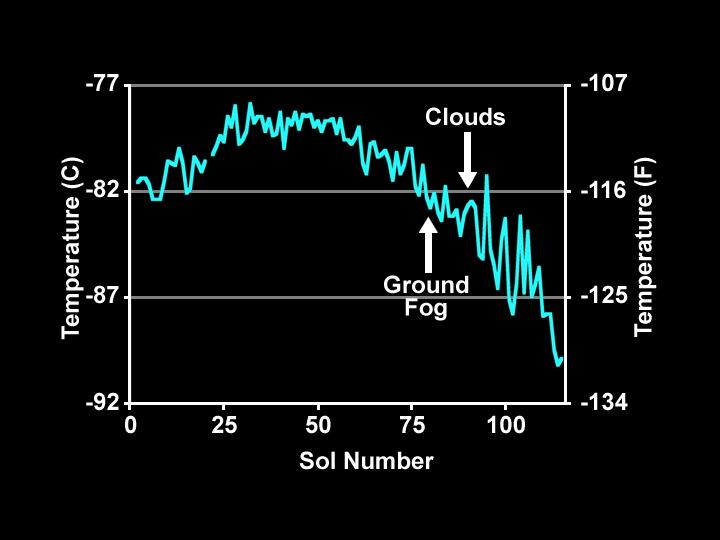
Plot of the minimum daily temperature measured by Phoenix

There are three temperature sensors (thermocouples) on a 1 m (3.3 ft) vertical mast (shown in its stowed position) at heights of approximately 250, 500 and 1,000 mm (9.8, 19.7 and 39.4 in) above the lander deck. The sensors were referenced to a measurement of absolute temperature at the base of the mast. A pressure sensor built by Finnish Meteorological Institute is located in the Payload Electronics Box, which sits on the surface of the deck, and houses the acquisition electronics for the MET payload. The Pressure and Temperature sensors commenced operations on Sol 0 (May 26, 2008) and operated continuously, sampling once every 2 seconds.

The Telltale is a joint Canadian/Danish instrument (right) which provides a coarse estimate of wind speed and direction. The speed is based on the amount of deflection from vertical that is observed, while the wind direction is provided by which way this deflection occurs. A mirror, located under the telltale, and a calibration "cross," above (as observed through the mirror) are employed to increase the accuracy of the measurement. Either camera, SSI or RAC, could make this measurement, though the former was typically used. Periodic observations both day and night aid in understanding the diurnal variability of wind at the Phoenix landing site.

The wind speeds ranged from 11 to 58 km/h (6.8 to 36.0 mph). The usual average speed was 36 km/h (22 mph).

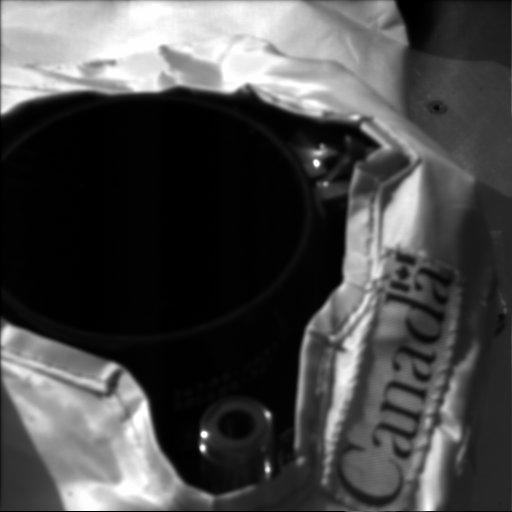
First operation of lidar on Mars; telescope (black tube) and laser window (smaller opening in foreground) can be seen.

The vertical-pointing lidar was capable of detecting multiple types of backscattering (for example Rayleigh scattering and Mie Scattering), with the delay between laser pulse generation and the return of light scattered by atmospheric particles determining the altitude at which scattering occurs. Additional information was obtained from backscattered light at different wavelengths (colors), and the Phoenix system transmitted both 532 nm and 1064 nm. Such wavelength dependence may make it possible to discriminate between ice and dust, and serve as an indicator of the effective particle size.

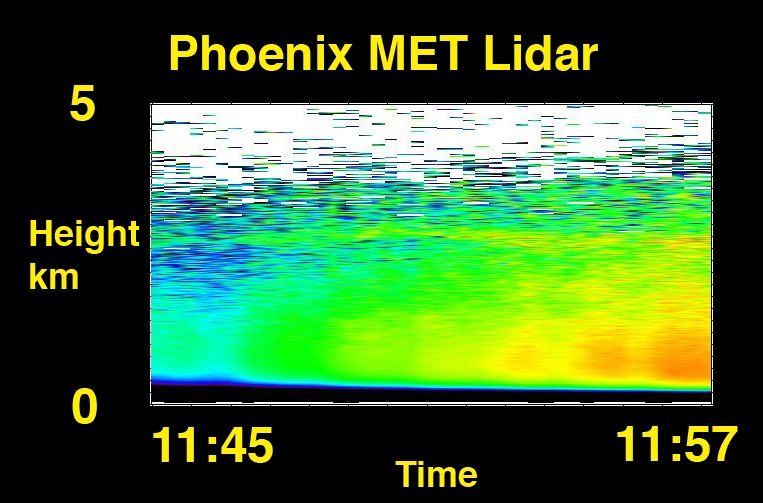
Contour plot of second lidar operation. The colors show evolution of dust passing overhead with time (red/orange: more dust, blue/green: less dust)

The Phoenix lidar's laser was a passive Q-switched Nd:YAG laser with the dual wavelengths of 1064 nm and 532 nm. It operated at 100 Hz with a pulse width of 10 ns. The scattered light was received by two detectors (green and IR) and the green signal was collected in both analog and photon counting modes.

Lidar operating (thin vertical beam at center right).

The lidar was operated for the first time at noon on Sol 3 (May 29, 2008), recording the first surface extraterrestrial atmospheric profile. This first profile indicated well-mixed dust in the first few kilometers of the atmosphere of Mars, where the planetary boundary layer was observed by a marked decrease in scattering signal. The contour plot (right) shows the amount of dust as a function of time and altitude, with warmer colors (red, orange) indicating more dust, and cooler colors (blue, green), indicating less dust. There is also an instrumentation effect of the laser warming up, causing the appearance of dust increasing with time. A layer at 3.5 km (2.2 mi) can be observed in the plot, which could be extra dust, or—less likely, given the time of sol this was acquired—a low altitude ice cloud.

The image on the left shows the lidar laser operating on the surface of Mars, as observed by the SSI looking straight up; the laser beam is the nearly-vertical line just right of center. Overhead dust can be seen both moving in the background, as well as passing through the laser beam in the form of bright sparkles. The fact that the beam appears to terminate is the result of the extremely small angle at which the SSI is observing the laser—it sees farther up along the beam's path than there is dust to reflect the light back down to it.

The laser device discovered snow falling from clouds; this was not known to occur before the mission. It was also determined that cirrus clouds formed in the area.

== Mission highlights ==
=== Launch ===
Animation of Phoenix's trajectory from August 5, 2007, to May 25, 2008 Phoenix · Sun · Earth · Mars

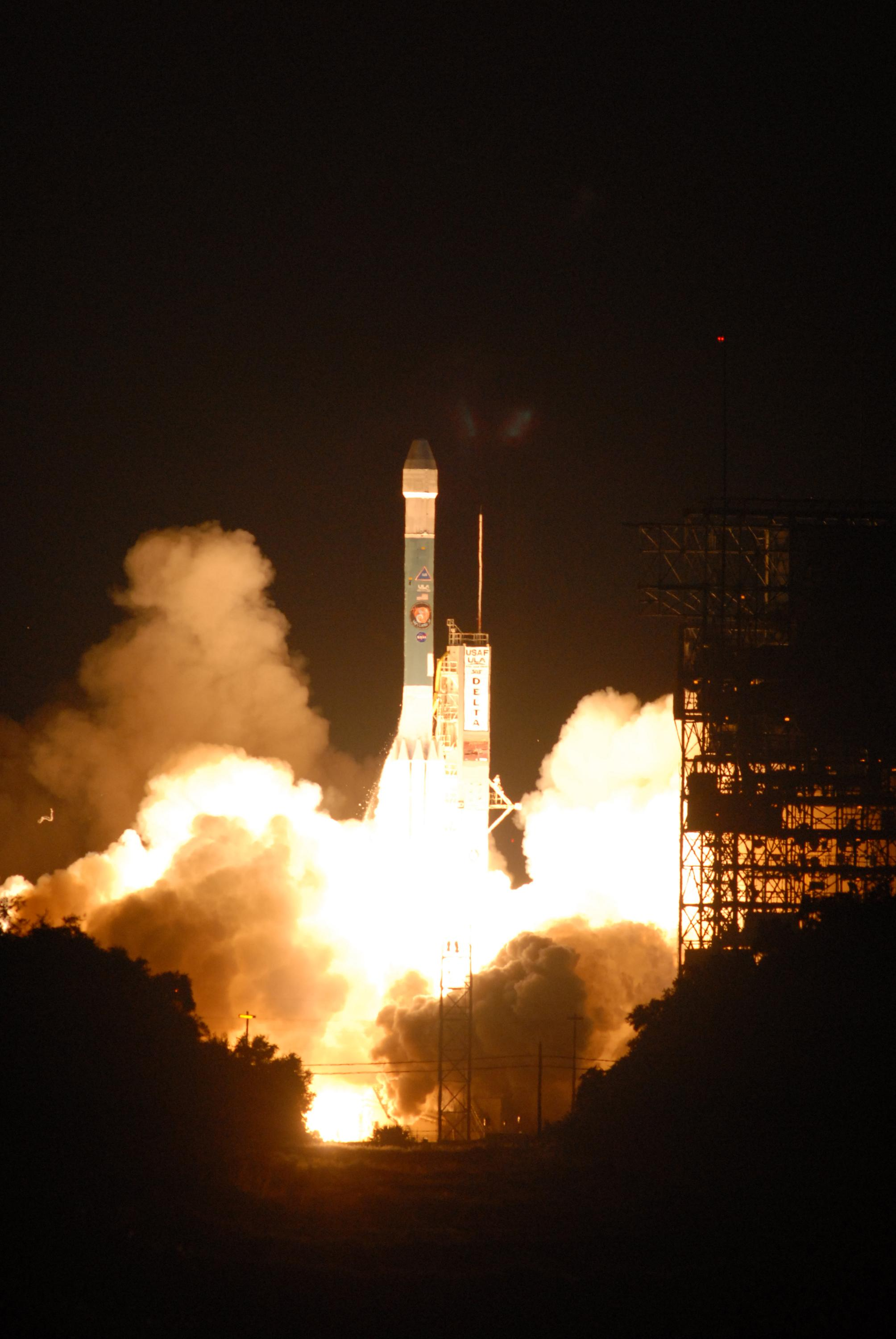
Phoenix is launched atop a Delta II 7925 rocket

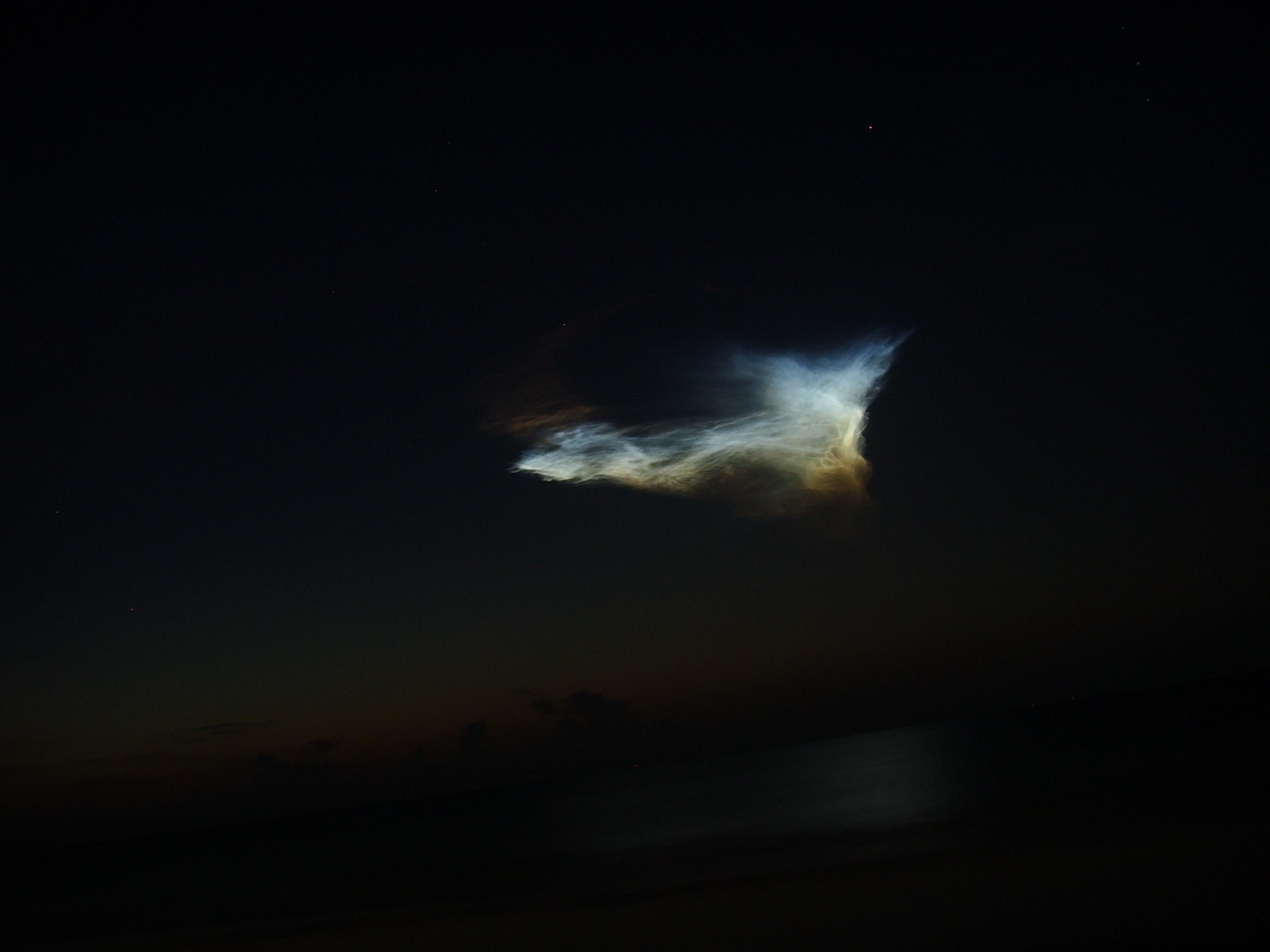
Noctilucent cloud created from the launch vehicle's exhaust gas.

Phoenix was launched on August 4, 2007, at 5:26:34 a.m. EDT (09:26:34 UTC) on a Delta II 7925 launch vehicle from Pad 17-A of the Cape Canaveral Air Force Station. The launch was nominal with no significant anomalies. The Phoenix lander was placed on a trajectory of such precision that its first trajectory course correction burn, performed on August 10, 2007, at 7:30 a.m. EDT (11:30 UTC), was only 18 m/s. The launch took place during a launch window extending from August 3, 2007, to August 24, 2007. Due to the small launch window, the rescheduled launch of the Dawn mission (originally planned for July 7) had to be launched after Phoenix in September. The Delta II rocket was chosen due to its successful launch history, which includes launches of the Spirit and Opportunity Mars Exploration Rovers in 2003 and Mars Pathfinder in 1996.

A noctilucent cloud was created by the exhaust gas from the Delta II 7925 rocket used to launch Phoenix. The colors in the cloud formed from the prism-like effect of the ice particles present in the exhaust trail.

=== Entry, descent, and landing ===
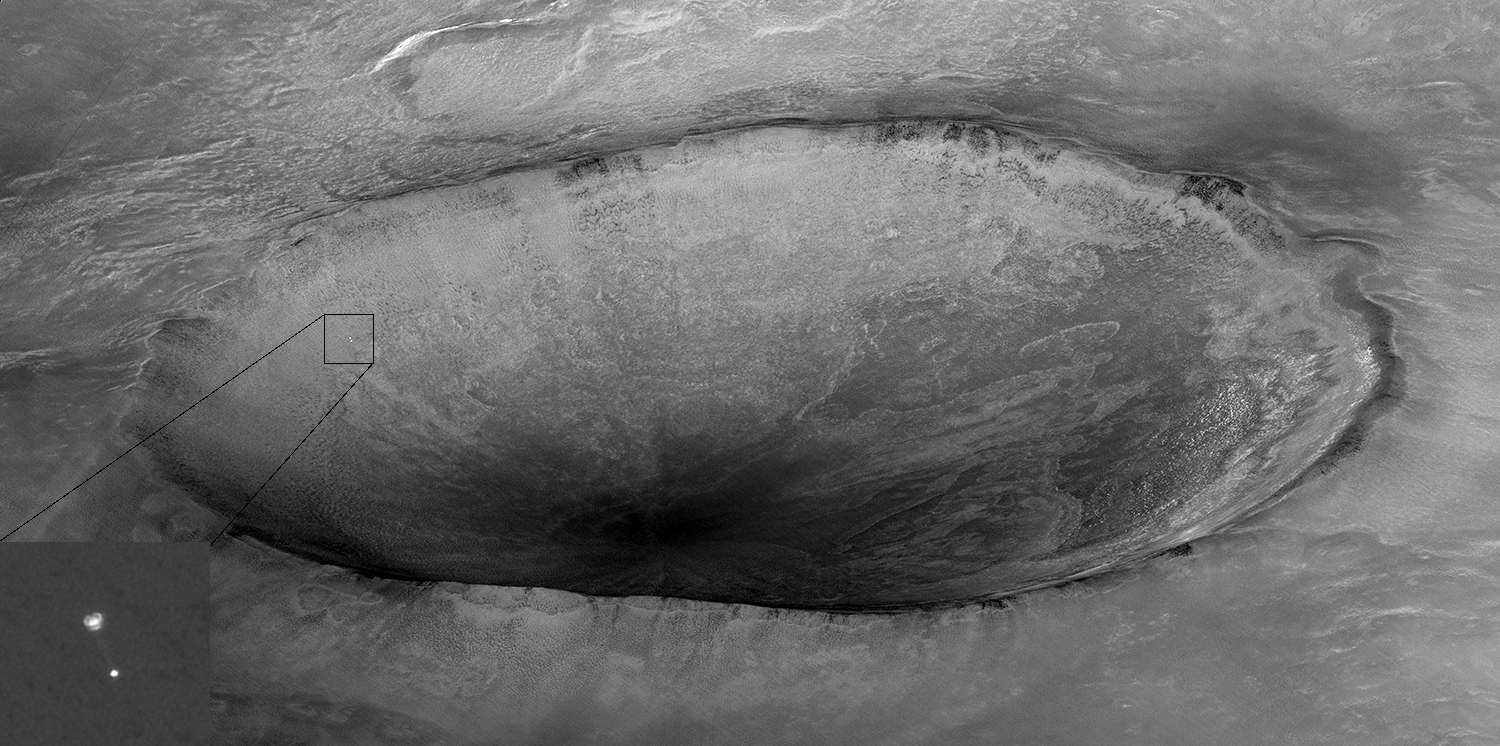
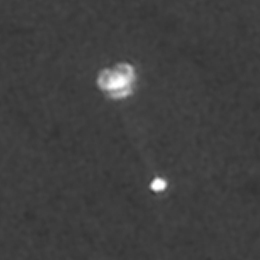
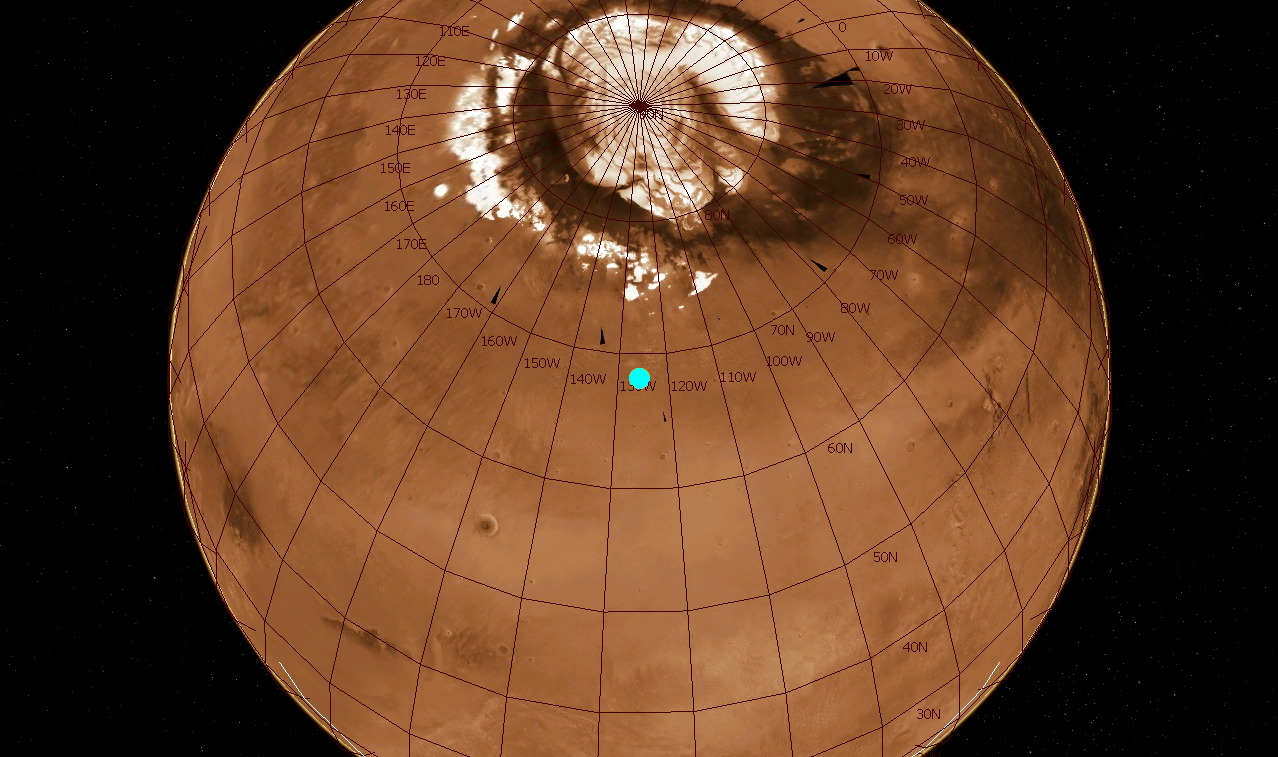
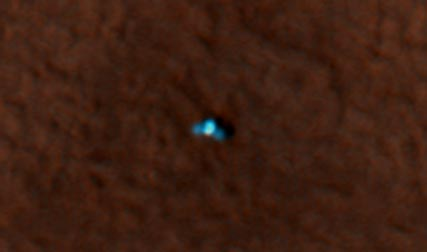
Top: Mars Reconnaissance Orbiter (MRO) imaged Phoenix (lower left corner) in the line of sight to the 10-km-wide Heimdal Crater (the craft is actually 20 km from it). (left) MRO imaged Phoenix suspended from its parachute during descent through the Martian atmosphere. (right)
Bottom: Phoenix landing site near N. polar cap (left); MRO image of Phoenix on the surface of Mars. Also see a larger image showing the parachute / backshell, and heat shield. (right)

The Jet Propulsion Laboratory made adjustments to the orbits of its two active satellites around Mars, Mars Reconnaissance Orbiter and Mars Odyssey, and the European Space Agency similarly adjusted the orbit of its Mars Express spacecraft to be in the right place on May 25, 2008, to observe Phoenix as it entered the atmosphere and then landed on the surface. This information helps designers to improve future landers. The projected landing area was an ellipse 100 by 20 km (62 by 12 mi) covering terrain which has been informally named "Green Valley" and contains the largest concentration of water ice outside the poles.

Phoenix entered the Martian atmosphere at nearly 21,000 km/h (13,000 mph), and within 7 minutes had decreased its speed to 8 km/h (5.0 mph) before touching down on the surface. Confirmation of atmospheric entry was received at 4:46 p.m. PDT (23:46 UTC). Radio signals received at 4:53:44 p.m. PDT confirmed that Phoenix had survived its difficult descent and landed 15 minutes earlier, thus completing a 680 million km (422 million miles) flight from Earth.

For unknown reasons, the parachute was deployed about 7 seconds later than expected, leading to a landing position some 25–28 km (16–17 mi) east, near the edge of the predicted 99% landing ellipse. Mars Reconnaissance Orbiter's High Resolution Imaging Science Experiment (HiRISE) camera photographed Phoenix suspended from its parachute during its descent through the Martian atmosphere. This marked the first time ever one spacecraft photographed another in the act of landing on a planet (the Moon not being a planet, but a satellite). The same camera also imaged Phoenix on the surface with enough resolution to distinguish the lander and its two solar cell arrays. Ground controllers used Doppler tracking data from Odyssey and Mars Reconnaissance Orbiter to determine the lander's precise location as 68.218830°N 234.250778°E.

Phoenix landed in the Green Valley of Vastitas Borealis on May 25, 2008, in the late Martian northern hemisphere spring (L_{s}=76.73), where the Sun shone on its solar panels the whole Martian day. By the Martian northern Summer solstice (June 25, 2008), the Sun appeared at its maximum elevation of 47.0 degrees. Phoenix experienced its first sunset at the start of September 2008.

The landing was made on a flat surface, with the lander reporting only 0.3 degrees of tilt. Just before landing, the craft used its thrusters to orient its solar panels along an east–west axis to maximize power generation. The lander waited 15 minutes before opening its solar panels, to allow dust to settle. The first images from the lander became available around 7:00 p.m. PDT (2008-05-26 02:00 UTC). The images show a surface strewn with pebbles and incised with small troughs into polygons about 5 m (16 ft) across and 10 cm (3.9 in) high, with the expected absence of large rocks and hills.

Like the 1970s era Viking spacecraft, Phoenix used retrorockets for its final descent. Experiments conducted by Nilton Renno, mission co-investigator from the University of Michigan, and his students have investigated how much surface dust would be kicked up on landing. Researchers at Tufts University, led by co-investigator Sam Kounaves, conducted additional in-depth experiments to identify the extent of the ammonia contamination from the hydrazine propellant and its possible effects on the chemistry experiments. In 2007, a report to the American Astronomical Society by Washington State University professor Dirk Schulze-Makuch, suggested that Mars might harbor peroxide-based life forms which the Viking landers failed to detect because of the unexpected chemistry. The hypothesis was proposed long after any modifications to Phoenix could be made. One of the Phoenix mission investigators, NASA astrobiologist Chris McKay, stated that the report "piqued his interest" and that ways to test the hypothesis with Phoenix's instruments would be sought.

=== Surface mission ===
==== Communications from the surface ====
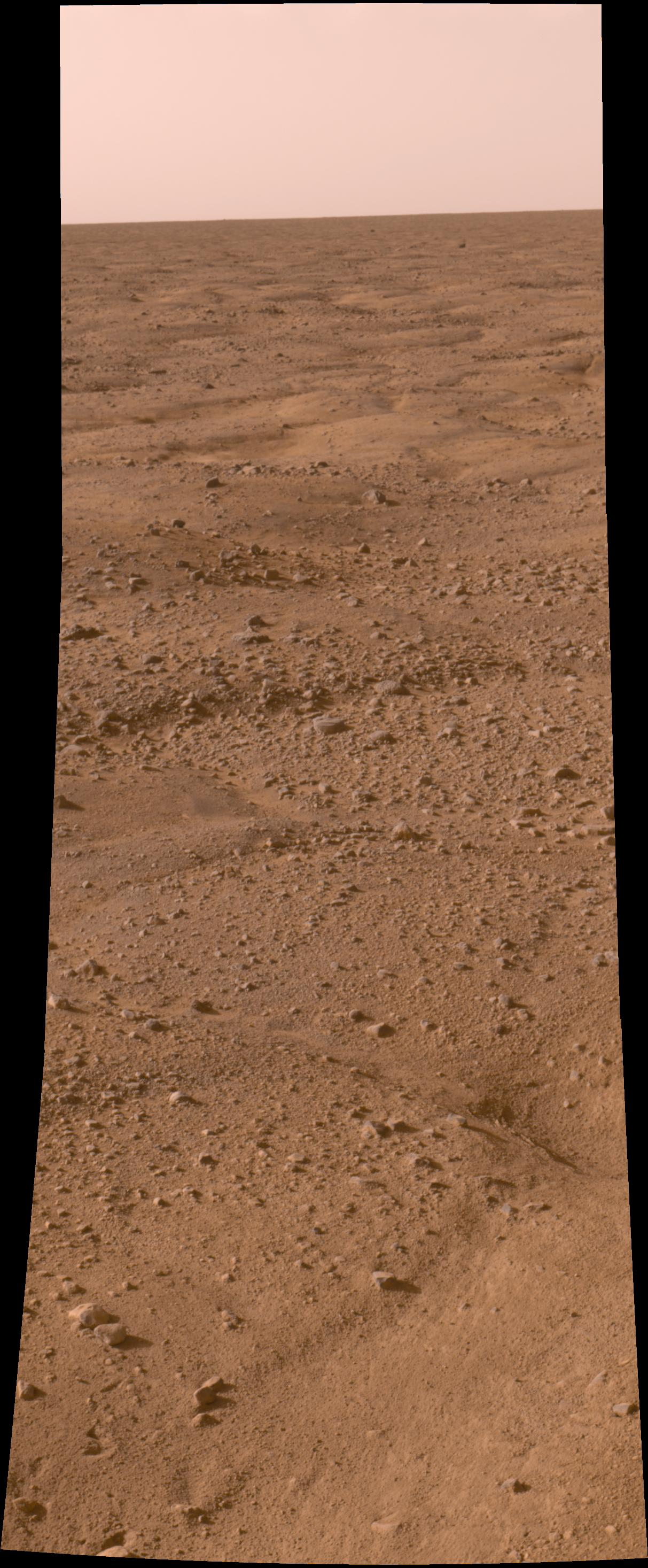
Approximate-color photomosaic of thermal contraction crack polygons in Martian permafrost.

The robotic arm's first movement was delayed by one day when, on May 27, 2008, commands from Earth were not relayed to the Phoenix lander on Mars. The commands went to NASA's Mars Reconnaissance Orbiter as planned, but the orbiter's Electra UHF radio system for relaying commands to Phoenix temporarily shut off. Without new commands, the lander instead carried out a set of backup activities. On May 27 the Mars Reconnaissance Orbiter relayed images and other information from those activities back to Earth.

The robotic arm was a critical part of the Phoenix Mars mission. On May 28, scientists leading the mission sent commands to unstow its robotic arm and take more images of its landing site. The images revealed that the spacecraft landed where it had access to digging down a polygon across the trough and digging into its center.

The lander's robotic arm touched soil on Mars for the first time on May 31, 2008 (sol 6). It scooped dirt and started sampling the Martian soil for ice after days of testing its systems.

==== Presence of shallow subsurface water ice ====
The polygonal cracking at the landing zone had previously been observed from orbit, and is similar to patterns seen in permafrost areas in polar and high altitude regions of Earth. Phoenix's robotic arm camera took an image underneath the lander on sol 5 that shows patches of a smooth bright surface uncovered when thruster exhaust blew off overlying loose soil. It was later shown to be water ice.

On June 19, 2008 (sol 24), NASA announced that dice-sized clumps of bright material in the "Dodo-Goldilocks" trench dug by the robotic arm had vaporized over the course of four days, strongly implying that they were composed of water ice which sublimed following exposure. While dry ice also sublimes, under the conditions present it would do so at a rate much faster than observed.

On July 31, 2008 (sol 65), NASA announced that Phoenix confirmed the presence of water ice on Mars, as predicted in 2002 by the Mars Odyssey orbiter. During the initial heating cycle of a new sample, TEGA's mass spectrometer detected water vapor when the sample temperature reached 0 °C. Liquid water cannot exist on the surface of Mars with its present low atmospheric pressure, except at the lowest elevations for short periods. Subsequent work analyzing the visible/near-infrared measurements of the water ice exposed at the "Dodo-Goldilocks" trench indicate that the water ice is consistent with snow (ice optical grain radius of 350 μm, similar to fine-grained older snow on Earth) containing 0.04% dust by mass formed during a past martian ice age.

With Phoenix in good working order, NASA announced operational funding through September 30, 2008 (sol 125). The science team worked to determine whether the water ice ever thaws enough to be available for life processes and if carbon-containing chemicals and other raw materials for life are present.

Additionally during 2008 and early 2009 a debate emerged within NASA over the presence of 'blobs' which appeared on photos of the vehicle's landing struts, which have been variously described as being either water droplets or 'clumps of frost'. Due to the lack of consensus within the Phoenix science project, the issue had not been raised in any NASA news conferences.

One scientist thought that the lander's thrusters splashed a pocket of brine from just below the Martian surface onto the landing strut during the vehicle's landing. The salts would then have absorbed water vapor from the air, which would have explained how they appeared to grow in size during the first 44 sols (Martian days) before slowly evaporating as Mars temperature dropped.

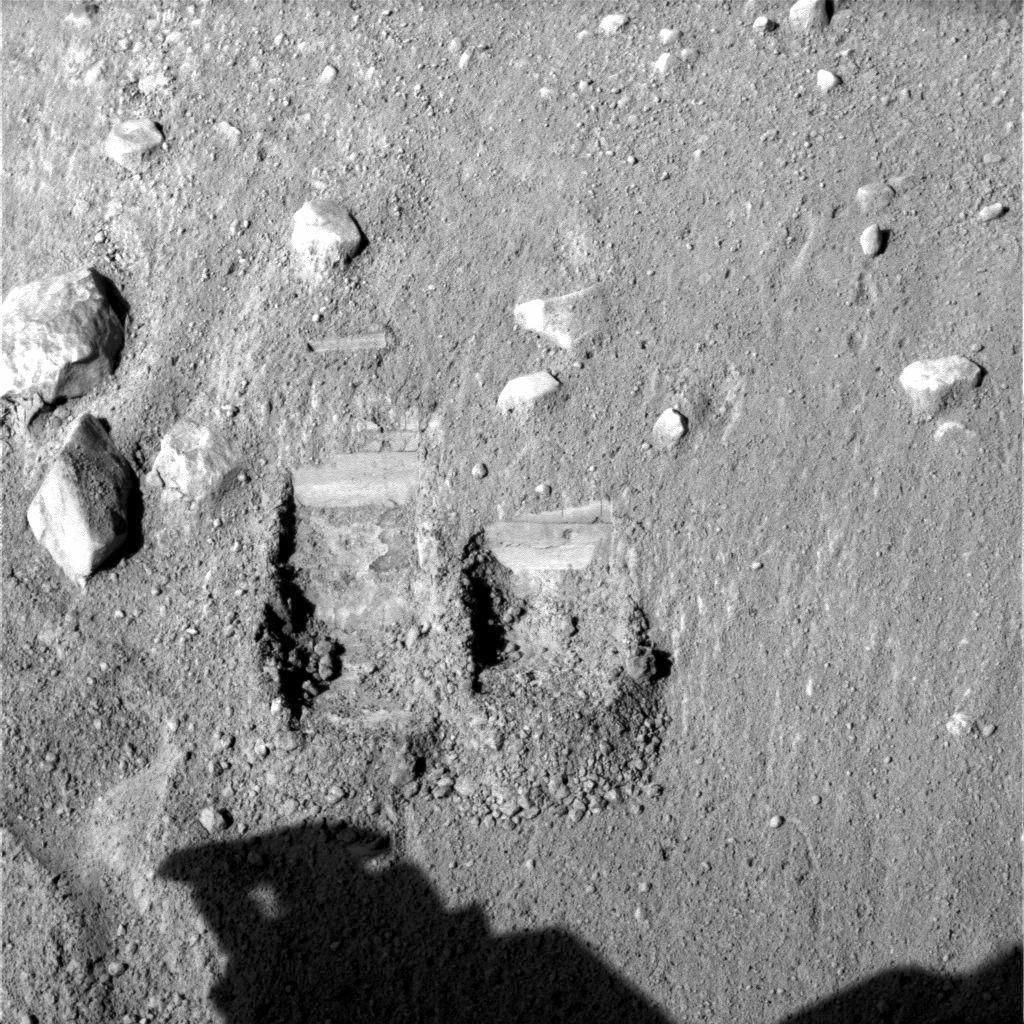
The first two trenches dug by Phoenix in Martian soil. The trench on the right, informally called "Baby Bear", is the source of the first samples delivered to the onboard TEGA and the optical microscope for analysis.

Clumps of bright material in the enlarged "Dodo-Goldilocks" trench vanished over the course of four days, implying that they were composed of ice which sublimated following exposure.

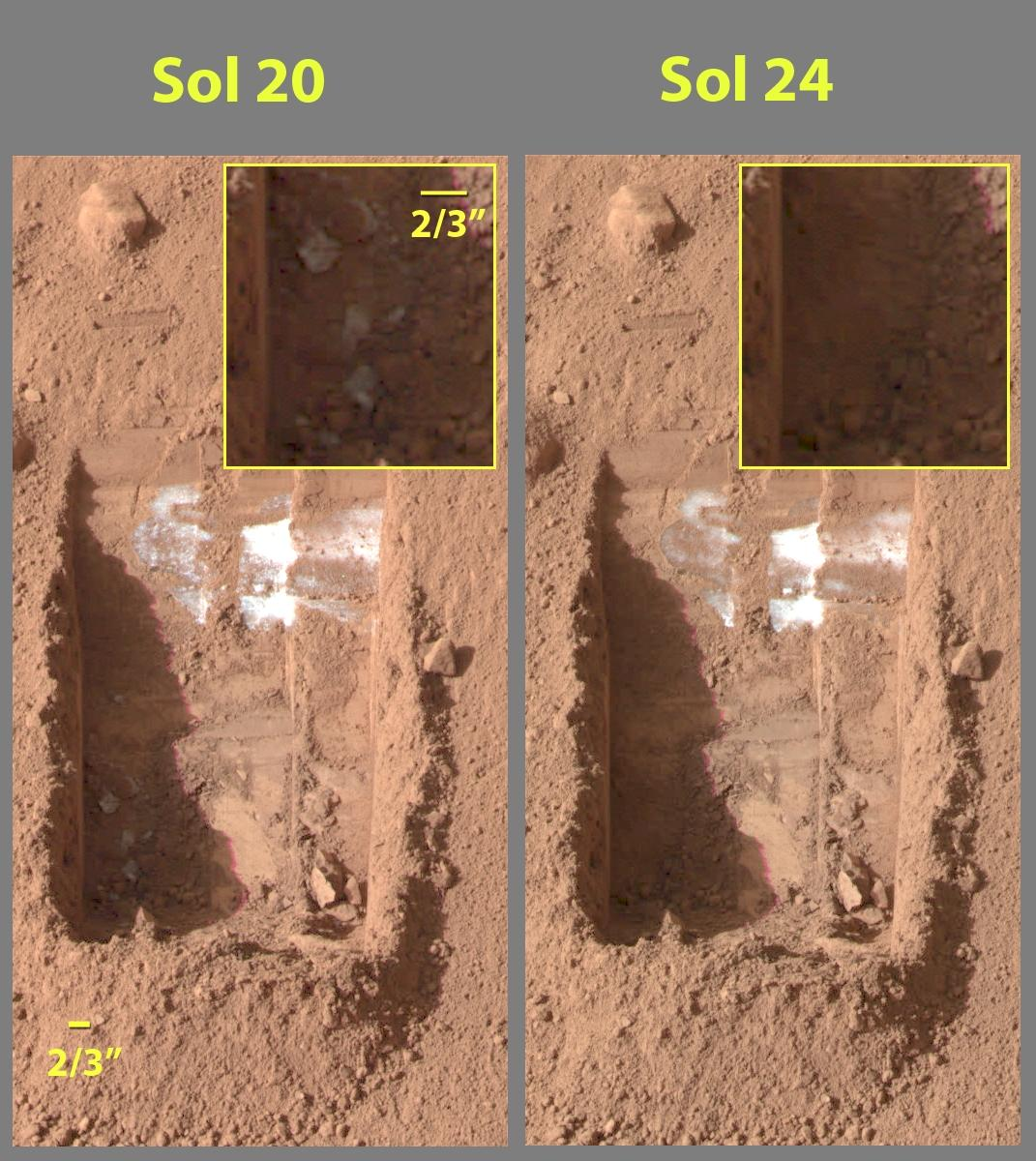
Color versions of the photos showing ice sublimation, with the lower left corner of the trench enlarged in the insets in the upper right of the images.

==== Wet chemistry ====
On June 24, 2008 (sol 29), NASA's scientists launched a series of scientific tests. The robotic arm scooped up more soil and delivered it to 3 different on-board analyzers: an oven that baked it and tested the emitted gases, a microscopic imager, and a wet chemistry laboratory (WCL). The lander's robotic arm scoop was positioned over the Wet Chemistry Lab delivery funnel on Sol 29 (the 29th Martian day after landing, i.e. June 24, 2008). The soil was transferred to the instrument on sol 30 (June 25, 2008), and Phoenix performed the first wet chemistry tests. On Sol 31 (June 26, 2008) Phoenix returned the wet chemistry test results with information on the salts in the soil, and its acidity. The wet chemistry lab (WCL) was part of the suite of tools called the Microscopy, Electrochemistry and Conductivity Analyzer (MECA).

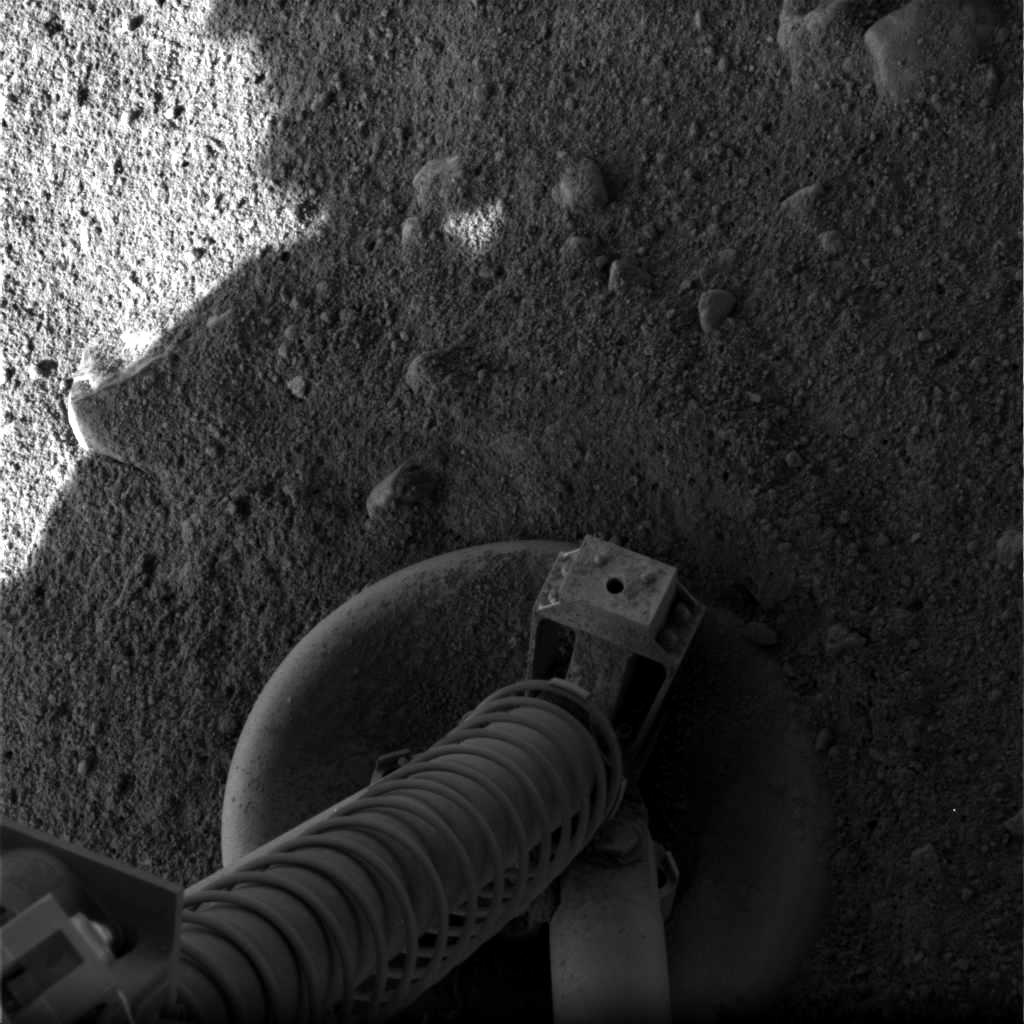
Phoenix footpad image, taken over 15 minutes after landing to ensure any dust stirred up had settled.

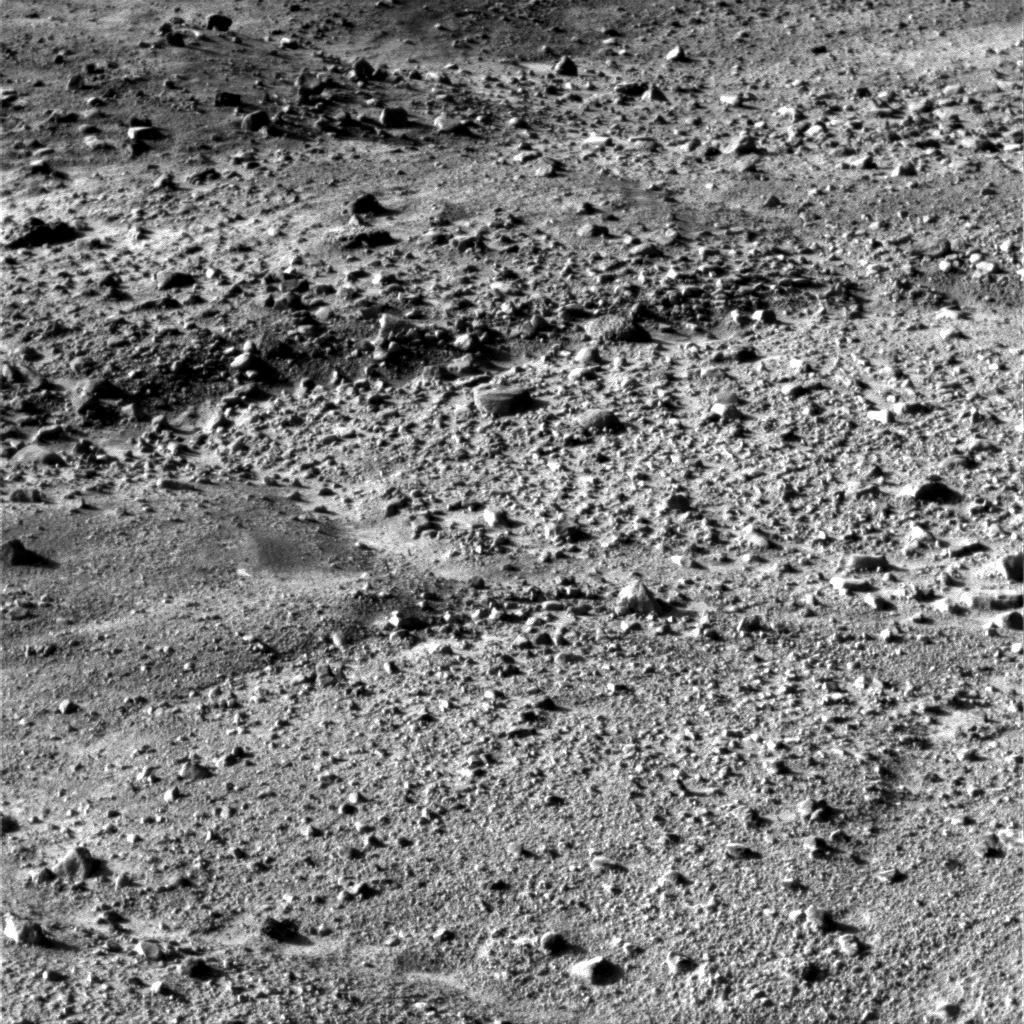
One of the first surface images from Phoenix.

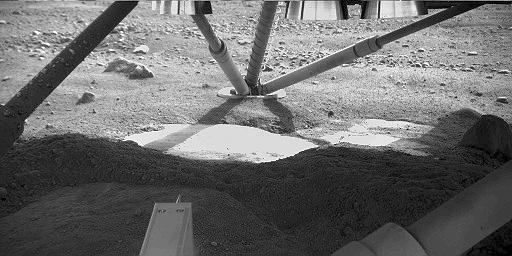
View underneath lander towards south foot pad, showing patchy exposures of a bright surface, possibly ice.
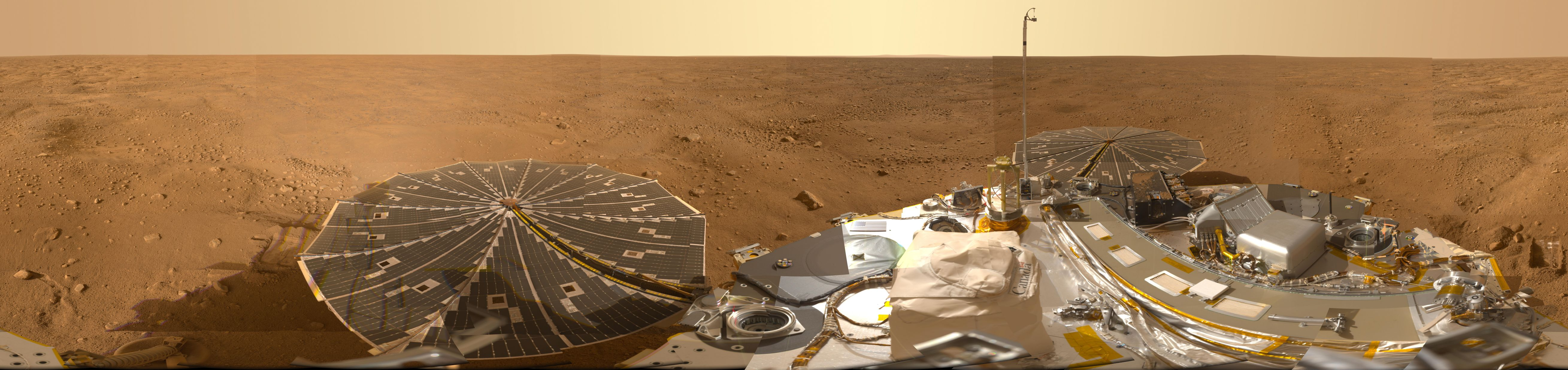
Panorama of rocks near the Phoenix Lander (May 25, 2008).
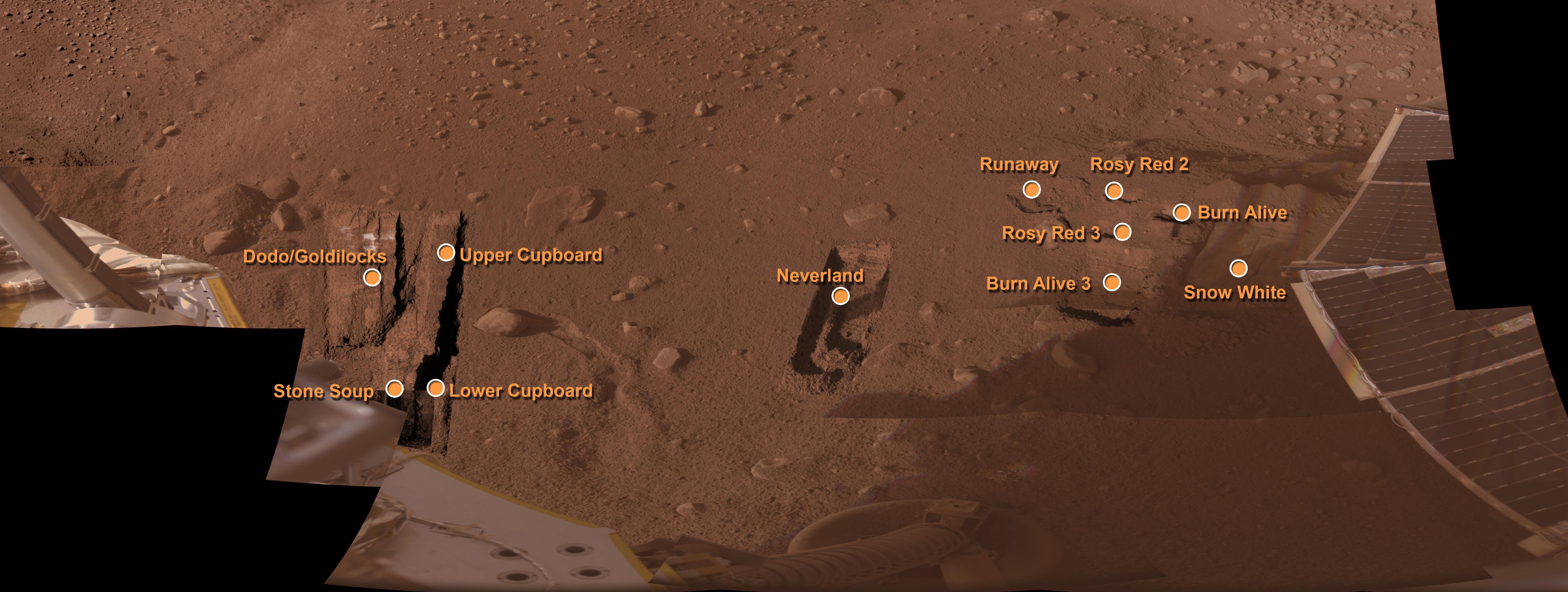
Panorama of rocks near the Phoenix Lander (August 19, 2008).

A 360-degree panorama assembled from images taken on sols 1 and 3 after landing. The upper portion has been vertically stretched by a factor of 8 to bring out details. Visible near the horizon at full resolution are the backshell and parachute (a bright speck above the right edge of the left solar array, about 300 m (980 ft) distant) and the heat shield and its bounce mark (two end-to-end dark streaks above the center of the left solar array, about 150 m (490 ft) distant); on the horizon, left of the weather mast, is a crater.

=== End of the mission ===
Phoenix lander – before/after 10 years (animation; December 21, 2017)

The solar-powered lander operated two months longer than its three-month prime mission. The lander was designed to last 90 days, and had been running on bonus time since the successful end of its primary mission in August 2008. On October 28, 2008 (sol 152), the lander went into safe mode due to power constraints based on the insufficient amount of sunlight reaching the lander, as expected at this time of year. It was decided then to shut down the four heaters that keep the equipment warm, and upon bringing the lander back from safe mode, commands were sent to turn off two of the heaters rather than only one as was originally planned for the first step. The heaters involved provide heat to the robotic arm, TEGA instrument and a pyrotechnic unit on the lander that were unused since landing, so these three instruments were also shut down.

On November 10, Phoenix Mission Control reported the loss of contact with the Phoenix lander; the last signal was received on November 2. The demise of the craft occurred as a result of a dust storm that reduced power generation even further. While the spacecraft's work ended, the analysis of data from the instruments was in its earliest stages.

==== Communication attempts 2010 ====
Though it was not designed to survive the frigid Martian winter, the spacecraft's safe mode kept the option open to reestablish communications if the lander could recharge its batteries during the next Martian spring. However, its landing location is in an area that is usually part of the north polar ice cap during the Martian winter, and the lander was seen from orbit to be encased in dry ice. It is estimated that, at its peak, the layer of CO_{2} ice in the lander's vicinity would total about 30 grams/cm^{2}, which is enough to make a dense slab of dry ice at least 19 cm (7.5 in) thick. It was considered unlikely that the spacecraft could endure these conditions, as its fragile solar panels would likely break off under so much weight.

Scientists attempted to make contact with Phoenix starting January 18, 2010 (sol -835), but were unsuccessful. Further attempts in February and April also failed to pick up any signal from the lander. Project manager Barry Goldstein announced on May 24, 2010, that the project was being formally ended. Images from the Mars Reconnaissance Orbiter showed that its solar panels were apparently irretrievably damaged by freezing during the Martian winter.

=== Results of the mission ===
==== Landscape ====
Unlike some other places visited on Mars with landers (Viking and Pathfinder), nearly all the rocks near Phoenix are small. For about as far as the camera can see, the land is flat, but shaped into polygons between 2–3 m (6.6–9.8 ft) in diameter and are bounded by troughs that are 20 to 50 cm (7.9 to 19.7 in) deep. These shapes are due to ice in the soil expanding and contracting due to major temperature changes. The microscope showed that the soil on top of the polygons is composed of flat particles (probably a type of clay) and rounded particles. Also, unlike other places visited on Mars, the site has no ripples or dunes. Ice is present a few inches below the surface in the middle of the polygons, and along its edges, the ice is at least 20 cm (8 in) deep. When the ice is exposed to the Martian atmosphere it slowly sublimates. Some dust devils were observed.

==== Weather ====
Snow was observed to fall from cirrus clouds. The clouds formed at a level in the atmosphere that was around −65 °C (−85 °F), so the clouds would have to be composed of water-ice, rather than carbon dioxide-ice (dry ice) because, at the low pressure of the Martian atmosphere, the temperature for forming carbon dioxide ice is much lower—less than −120 °C (−184 °F). It is now thought that water ice (snow) would have accumulated later in the year at this location. This represents a milestone in understanding Martian weather. Wind speeds ranged from 11 to 58 km/h (6.8 to 36.0 mph). The usual average speed was 36 km/h (22 mph). These speeds seem high, but the atmosphere of Mars is very thin—less than 1% of the Earth's—and so did not exert much force on the spacecraft. The highest temperature measured during the mission was −19.6 °C (−3.3 °F), while the coldest was −97.7 °C (−143.9 °F).

==== Climate cycles ====
Interpretation of the data transmitted from the craft was published in the journal Science. As per the peer-reviewed data the presence of water ice has been confirmed and that the site had a wetter and warmer climate in the recent past. Finding calcium carbonate in the Martian soil leads scientists to think that the site had been wet or damp in the geological past. During seasonal or longer period diurnal cycles water may have been present as thin films. The tilt or obliquity of Mars changes far more than the Earth; hence times of higher humidity are probable.

==== Surface chemistry ====
Chemistry results showed the surface soil to be moderately alkaline, with a pH of 7.7 ±0.5. The overall level of salinity is modest. TEGA analysis of its first soil sample indicated the presence of bound water and CO_{2} that were released during the final (highest-temperature, 1,000 °C) heating cycle.

The elements detected and measured in the samples are chloride, bicarbonate, magnesium, sodium, potassium, calcium, and sulfate. Further data analysis indicated that the soil contains soluble sulfate (SO_{4}^{2-}) at a minimum of 1.1% and provided a refined formulation of the soil.

Analysis of the Phoenix WCL also showed that the Ca(ClO_{4})_{2} in the soil has not interacted with liquid water of any form, perhaps for as long as 600 million years. If it had, the highly soluble Ca(ClO_{4})_{2} in contact with liquid water would have formed only CaSO_{4}. This suggests a severely arid environment, with minimal or no liquid water interaction. The pH and salinity level were viewed as benign from the standpoint of biology.

Perchlorate

On August 1, 2008, Aviation Week reported that "The White House has been alerted by NASA about plans to make an announcement soon on major new Phoenix lander discoveries concerning the "potential for life" on Mars, scientists tell Aviation Week & Space Technology." This led to a subdued media speculation on whether some evidence of past or present life had been discovered. To quell the speculation, NASA released the preliminary findings stating that Mars soil contains perchlorate (ClO_{4}) and thus may not be as life-friendly as thought earlier. The presence of almost 0.5% perchlorates in the soil was an unexpected finding with broad implications.

Laboratory research published in July 2017 demonstrated that when irradiated with a simulated Martian UV flux, perchlorates become bacteriocidal. Two other compounds of the Martian surface, iron oxides and hydrogen peroxide, act in synergy with irradiated perchlorates to cause a 10.8-fold increase in cell death when compared to cells exposed to UV radiation after 60 seconds of exposure. It was also found that abraded silicates (quartz and basalt) lead to the formation of toxic reactive oxygen species. The results leaves the question of the presence of organic compounds open-ended since heating the samples containing perchlorate would have broken down any organics present. However, in the cold subsurface of Mars, which provides substantial protection against UV radiation, halotolerant organisms might survive enhanced perchlorate concentrations by physiological adaptations similar to those observed in the yeast Debaryomyces hansenii exposed in lab experiments to increasing NaClO_{4} concentrations.

Perchlorate (ClO_{4}) is a strong oxidizer, so it has the potential of being used for rocket fuel and as a source of oxygen for future missions. Also, when mixed with water, perchlorate can greatly lower freezing point of water, in a manner similar to how salt is applied to roads to melt ice. So, perchlorate may be allowing small amounts of liquid water to form on the surface of Mars today. Gullies, which are common in certain areas of Mars, may have formed from perchlorate melting ice and causing water to erode soil on steep slopes. Perchlorates have also been detected at the landing site of the Curiosity rover, nearer equatorial Mars, and in the martian meteorite EETA79001, suggesting a "global distribution of these salts". Only highly refractory and/or well-protected organic compounds are likely to be preserved in the frozen subsurface. Therefore, the MOMA instrument planned to fly on the 2022 ExoMars rover will employ a method that is unaffected by the presence of perchlorates to detect and measure sub-surface organics.

=== Possible extremophile contamination ===
A 2025 study found 26 new extremophile bacteria species in the cleanrooms that were used to build the Phoenix lander. It is possible that some of these species can survive in space.

== Phoenix DVD ==
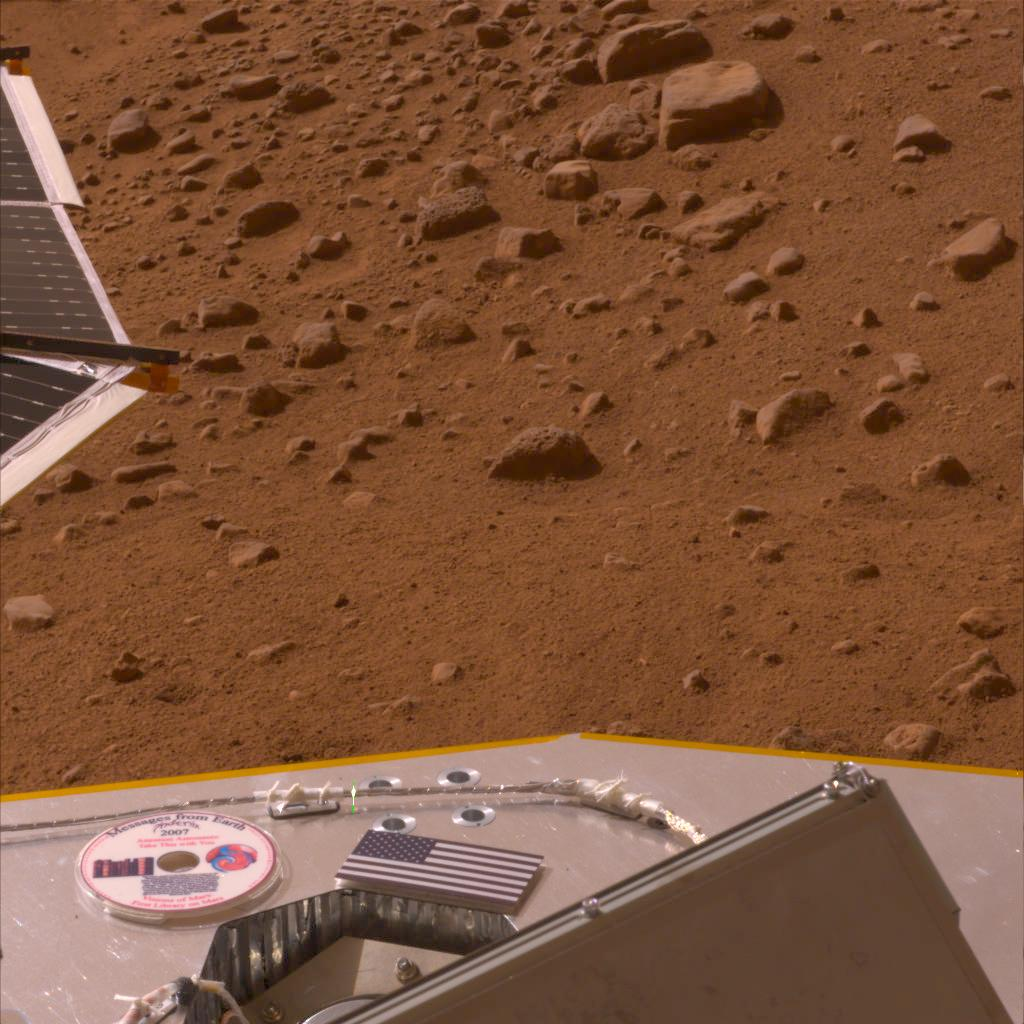
The "Phoenix DVD" on Mars.

Attached to the deck of the lander (next to the US flag) is a special DVD compiled by The Planetary Society. The disc contains Visions of Mars, a multimedia collection of literature and art about the Red Planet. Works include the text of H.G. Wells's 1897 novel War of the Worlds (and the 1938 radio broadcast by Orson Welles), Percival Lowell's 1908 book Mars as the Abode of Life with a map of his proposed canals, Ray Bradbury's 1950 novel The Martian Chronicles, and Kim Stanley Robinson's 1993 novel Green Mars. There are also messages directly addressed to future Martian visitors or settlers from, among others, Carl Sagan and Arthur C. Clarke. In 2006, The Planetary Society collected a quarter of a million names submitted through the Internet and placed them on the disc, which claims, on the front, to be "the first library on Mars." This DVD is made of a special silica glass designed to withstand the Martian environment, lasting for hundreds (if not thousands) of years on the surface while it awaits retrieval by future explorers. This is similar in concept to the Voyager Golden Record that was sent on the Voyager 1 and Voyager 2 missions.

The text just below the center of the disk reads:

This archive, provided to the NASA Phoenix mission by The Planetary Society, contains literature and art (Visions of Mars), greetings from Mars visionaries of our day, and names of 21st century Earthlings who wanted to send their names to Mars. This DVD-ROM is designed to be read on personal computers in 2007. Information is stored in a spiral groove on the disc. A laser beam can scan the groove when metallized or a microscope can be used. Very small bumps and holes represent the zeroes and ones of digital information. The groove is about 0.74 micrometres wide. For more information refer to the standards document ECMA-268 (80 mm DVD Read-Only Disk).

A previous CD version was supposed to have been sent with the Russian spacecraft Mars 94, intended to land on Mars in Fall 1995.
