= Proximity-1 Space Link Protocol =

Communication protocol between lander and orbiter

Proximity-1 Space Link Protocol is a short haul delivery communications protocol designed to establish a two-way communications link between a lander and an orbiter, negotiate data rate and communications mode, and reliably deliver data during short orbiter-to-surface contacts.

Developed by Consultative Committee for Space Data Systems and documented in a number of CCSDS Recommendations Proximity-1 is implemented on Mars Exploration Rovers, Mars Odyssey, Mars Reconnaissance Orbiter, Mars Express as well as on Phoenix Mars Lander.

The frequency band used by this protocol is in the 70-centimeter band so as to reduce complexity of the ground craft, using these frequencies:

- 437.1000 MHz
- 440.7425 MHz
- 444.3850 MHz
- 448.0275 MHz

However, using this protocol over the standard CCSDS frequency bands is perfectly acceptable if the UHF allocation is not usable.
