= Lunar and Planetary Laboratory =

Lab at University of Arizona

Coordinates: 32.232°N 110.947°W

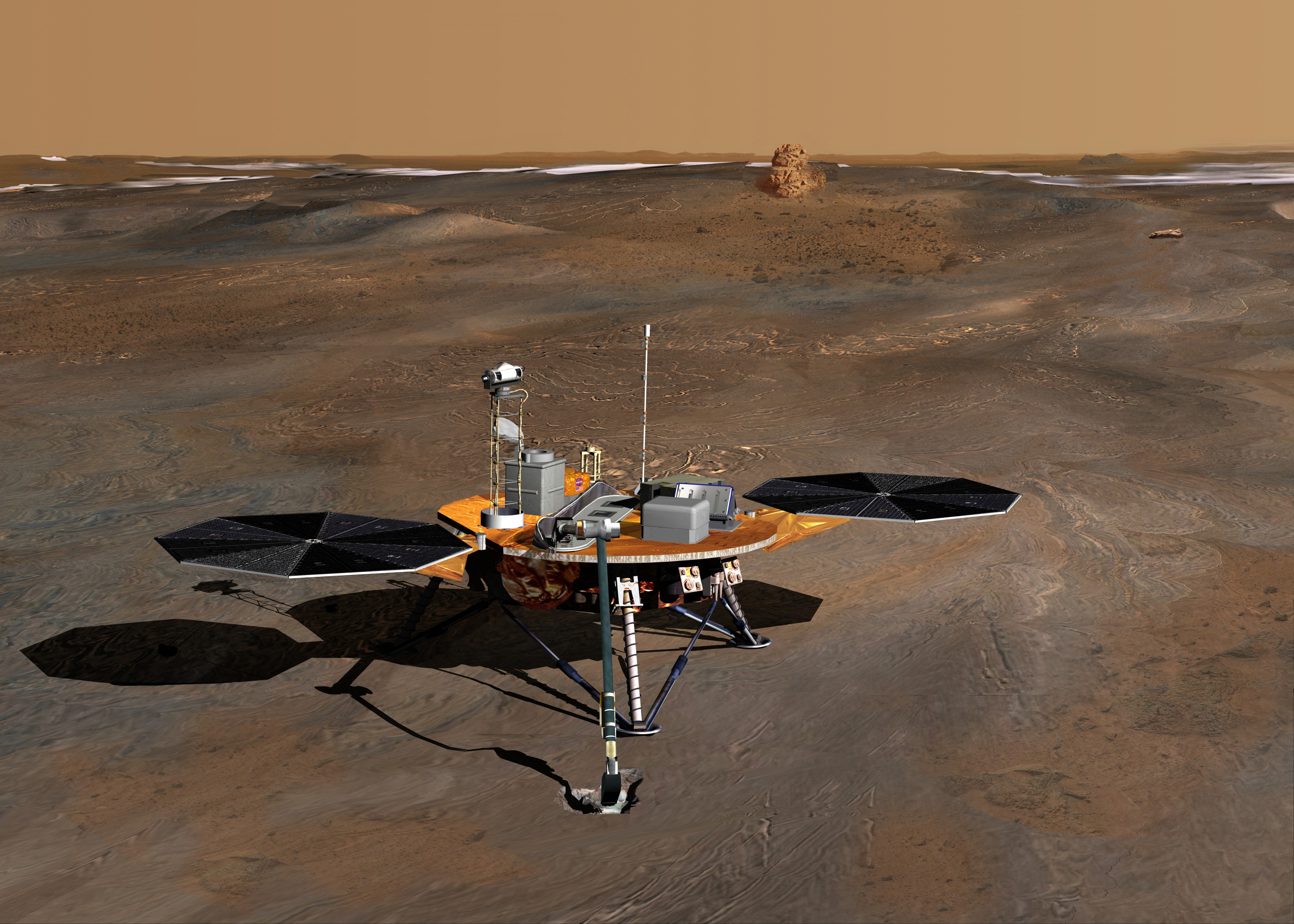
Conceptual image of the Phoenix Mars lander

The Lunar and Planetary Laboratory (LPL) is a research center for planetary science located in Tucson, Arizona. It is also a graduate school, constituting the Department of Planetary Sciences at the University of Arizona. LPL is one of the world's largest programs dedicated exclusively to planetary science in a university setting. The Lunar and Planetary Lab collection is held at the University of Arizona Special Collections Library.

== Background ==
LPL was founded in 1960 by astronomer Gerard Kuiper. Kuiper had long been a pioneer in observing the Solar System, especially the Moon, at a time when this was unfashionable among astronomers. Among his contributions are the discovery of Miranda and Nereid, the detection of carbon dioxide on Mars and of methane on Titan, and the prediction of the Kuiper Belt.

Kuiper came to Tucson looking for greater independence than he had enjoyed at the University of Chicago, the chance to build a community dedicated to solar system studies, and also to be closer to southern Arizona's many potential sites for world-class observatories, such as Kitt Peak National Observatory (founded in 1958). LPL was established under the auspices of the University of Arizona, with Kuiper serving as director until his death.

LPL's endeavors are interdisciplinary. The accumulated knowledge and techniques of astronomy, physics, chemistry, geology, geophysics, geochemistry, atmospheric science, and engineering are all implemented towards the single goal of studying planetary systems. Many students come to LPL having studied only one or two of these subjects in detail making a broad-based curriculum essential.

In 1973, the university established a graduate Department of Planetary Sciences, operating continuously with LPL. This provided an administrative framework for LPL to admit graduate students and take a greater role in teaching. LPL's chief officer is simultaneously "head" of the department and "director" of the laboratory. The current Head and Director is Mark Marley.

== Spacecraft missions ==
The Lunar and Planetary Laboratory has been involved in almost every interplanetary spacecraft sent. These are some of the major ones that it was or is involved:

- OSIRIS-REx – Asteroid – Responsible for the Principal Investigator, building the camera system, science operations, and Education and Public Outreach..
- MAVEN – Mars – Dr. Roger Yelle is an interdisciplinary scientist on the mission.
- Phoenix Scout Mission – Mars – Responsible for the Principal Investigator, building the camera systems and the TEGA instrument, and for science operations on the surface of Mars.
- Mars Reconnaissance Orbiter – Mars – Responsible for building and operating the HiRISE camera, the largest aperture camera ever sent to another planet.
- Mars Global Surveyor – Mars – Dr. Alfred McEwen is a participating scientist on the Mars Orbital Camera Team. Dr. Steve Bougher is a member of the MGS aerobraking team which is conducting aerobraking exercises (Fall 1997 and Fall 1998).
- Deep Space 2 – Mars – One of the science team members was from the Lunar and Planetary Laboratory.
- Mars Odyssey – Mars – Responsible for the Gamma Ray Spectrometer, for building and maintaining it.
- Pioneer 10 – Jupiter – Responsible for the IPP: The Imaging Photopolarimeter, for operating it.
- Pioneer 11 – Jupiter and Saturn – Responsible for the IPP: The Imaging Photopolarimeter, for operating it.
- Pioneer Venus – Venus – Responsible for the LSFR: The Large Probe Solar Flux Radiometer, for calibrating and operating it.
- MESSENGER – Mercury – Scientist participates in the Mercury Atmospheric and Surface Composition Spectrometer (MASCS).
- Galileo – Jupiter – Built part of the ultraviolet spectrometer on board the spacecraft
- Cassini – Saturn – Major team contributor. Responsible for taking and analyzing images of the surface of Titan and Enceladus.
- Deep Impact – Comet Tempel 1 – LPL Scientist helped to run many of the simulations to ensure the spacecraft would reach its target.
- Mars Pathfinder – Mars – Designed, integrated, and operated one of the cameras on the lander.
- Huygens Probe – Saturn's moon Titan – The university built and operated the only camera on the probe, and is responsible for a number of movies that show the landing. See the LPL Huygens Site page for some more info, and the movies.
- Mars Polar Lander – Mars – Built Thermal Evolved Gas Analyzer, a similar instrument is on the Phoenix Scout Lander.
- Voyager – Jupiter, Saturn, Uranus, Neptune – Built and operated the Ultraviolet Spectrometer, and participated on the imaging team on the spacecraft.
- Ulysses – Sun – Two scientists participated in the investigations of heliospheric cosmic ray physics and properties of the interplanetary medium.
- NEAR – Near-Earth asteroid Eros – Participated in the X-Ray/Gamma-Ray Spectrometer (XGRS) science team.

== Astronomical observations ==
The Lunar and Planetary Laboratory is involved with Spacewatch, the program to identify near-Earth asteroids, with the Planetary Atmosphere Project to measure the content of the atmospheres of various planets, with occultations, the art of measuring the spectrography of a star when it passes behind a planet, to see what a planet's atmosphere is composed of, with studies of the planet Mercury, with the Catalina Sky Survey, related to the Spacewatch program, as well as interdisciplinary sciences such as Theoretical Astrophysics and Space Physics, helping to find the answers to such questions as: What is Dark matter?

== Annual Events ==
The Art of Planetary science is an annual art exhibition run by the LPL to celebrate the beauty and elegance of science. The art exhibit was founded by graduate students in 2013 as a public outreach program and as a means to bridge the gap between scientific and artistic communities. In 2017, The Art of Planetary Science displayed over 200 pieces of art from approximately 100 artists and scientists, drawing more than 700 guests. Says Geoff Notkin, "It is wonderful to see a real variety and innovative art both inspired by and for inspiring people interested in space, science, and exploration."
