= Climate of Mars =

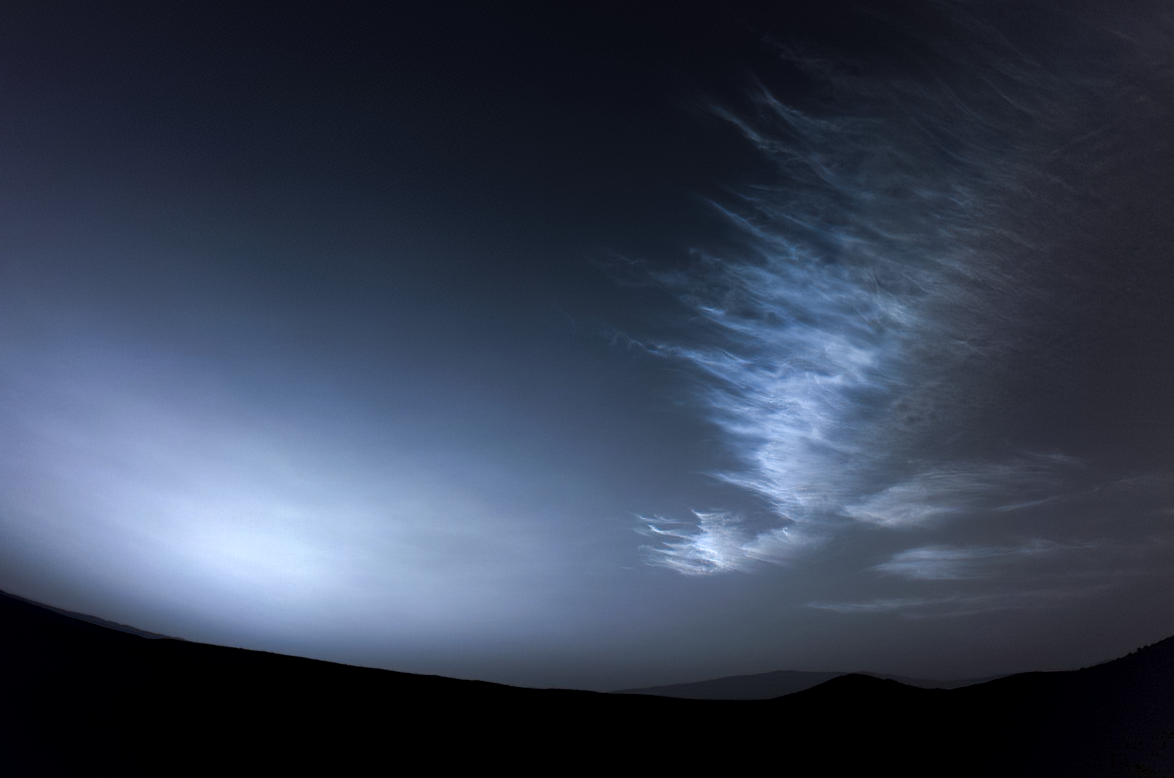
Mars's cloudy sky as seen by Perseverance rover in 2023, sol 738.

The climate of Mars has been a topic of scientific curiosity for centuries, in part because it is the only terrestrial planet whose surface can be easily observed in detail from Earth using a telescope.

Although Mars is smaller than Earth, with only one-tenth of Earth's mass, and is 50% farther from the Sun than Earth, its climate has important similarities with Earth's, such as the presence of polar ice caps, seasonal changes, and observable weather patterns. It has attracted sustained study from planetologists and climatologists. While Mars' climate has similarities to Earth's, including periodic ice ages, there are also important differences, such as much lower thermal inertia. Mars' atmosphere has a scale height of approximately 11 km (36,000 ft), which is 60% greater than that of Earth. The climate is of considerable relevance to the question of whether life is or ever has been present on the planet.

Mars has been studied with Earth-based instruments since the 17th century, but it is only since the exploration of Mars began in the mid-1960s that close-range observation has been possible. Flyby and orbital spacecraft have provided data from above, while landers and rovers have measured atmospheric conditions directly. Advanced Earth-orbital instruments today continue to provide some useful "big picture" observations of relatively large weather phenomena.

The first Martian flyby mission was Mariner 4, which arrived in 1965. That quick two-day pass (July 14–15, 1965) with crude instruments contributed little to the state of knowledge of Martian climate. Later Mariner missions (Mariner 6 and 7) filled in some of the gaps in basic climate information. Data-based climate studies started in earnest with the Viking program landers in 1975 and continue with such probes as the Mars Reconnaissance Orbiter.

This observational work has been complemented by a type of scientific computer simulation called the Mars general circulation model (MGCM). Several different iterations of MGCM have led to an increased understanding of Mars as well as the limits of such models.

== Historical climate observations ==
Giacomo Maraldi determined in 1704 that the southern cap is not centered on the rotational pole of Mars. During the opposition of 1719, Maraldi observed both polar caps and the temporal variability in their extent.

William Herschel was the first to deduce the low density of the Martian atmosphere in his 1784 paper entitled On the remarkable appearances at the polar regions on the planet Mars, the inclination of its axis, the position of its poles, and its spheroidal figure; with a few hints relating to its real diameter and atmosphere. When Mars appeared to pass close by two faint stars with no effect on their brightness, Herschel correctly concluded that this meant there was little atmosphere around Mars to interfere with their light.

Honore Flaugergues's 1809 discovery of "yellow clouds" on the surface of Mars is the first known observation of Martian dust storms. Flaugergues also observed in 1813 significant polar ice waning during Martian springtime. His speculation that this meant that Mars was warmer than Earth proved inaccurate.

== Martian paleoclimatology ==
There are two dating systems currently in use for Martian geological time. One is based on crater density and has three ages: Noachian, Hesperian, and Amazonian. The other is a mineralogical timeline, which also has three ages: Phyllocian, Theikian, and Siderikian.

Martian Time Periods (Millions of Years Ago)

Recent observations and modeling are producing information not only about the present climate and atmospheric conditions on Mars but also about its past. The Noachian-era Martian atmosphere had long been theorized to be carbon dioxide–rich. Recent spectral observations of deposits of clay minerals on Mars and modeling of clay mineral formation conditions have found that there is little to no carbonate present in the clay of that era. Clay formation in a carbon dioxide–rich environment is always accompanied by carbonate formation, although the carbonate may later be dissolved by volcanic acidity.

The discovery of water-formed minerals on Mars, including hematite and jarosite, by the Opportunity rover and goethite by the Spirit rover, has led to the conclusion that climatic conditions in the distant past allowed for free-flowing water on Mars. The morphology of some crater impacts on Mars indicates that the ground was wet at the time of impact. Geomorphic observations of both landscape erosion rates and Martian valley networks also strongly imply warmer, wetter conditions on Noachian-era Mars (earlier than about four billion years ago). However, chemical analysis of Martian meteorite samples suggests that the ambient near-surface temperature of Mars has most likely been below 0 °C (32 °F) for the last four billion years.

Some scientists maintain that the great mass of the Tharsis volcanoes has had a major influence on Mars's climate. Erupting the volcanoes give off great amounts of gas, mainly water vapor and CO_{2}. Enough gas may have been released by volcanoes to have made the earlier Martian atmosphere thicker than Earth's. The volcanoes could also have emitted enough H_{2}O to cover the whole Martian surface to a depth of 120 m (390 ft). Carbon dioxide is a greenhouse gas that raises a planet's temperature: it traps heat by absorbing infrared radiation. Thus, Tharsis the volcanoes, by giving off CO_{2}, could have made Mars more Earth-like in the past. Mars may have once had a much thicker and warmer atmosphere, and oceans or lakes may have been present. It has, however, proven extremely difficult to construct convincing global climate models for Mars that produce temperatures above 0 °C (32 °F) at any point in its history, although this may simply reflect problems in accurately calibrating such models.

Evidence of a geologically recent, extreme ice age on Mars was published in 2016. Just 370,000 years ago, the planet would have appeared more white than red.

== Weather ==
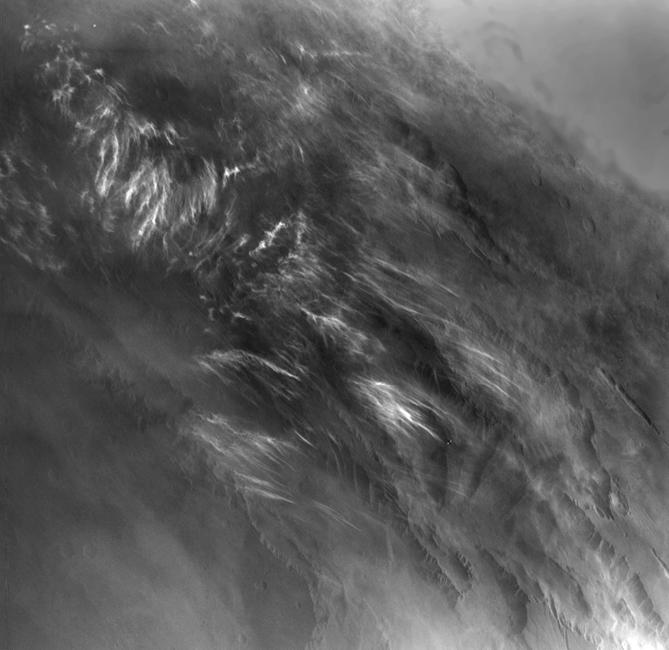
Martian morning clouds (Viking Orbiter 1, 1976)

Mars's temperature and circulation vary over the course of every Martian year (as expected for any planet with an atmosphere and axial tilt). Mars lacks oceans, a source of much interannual variation on Earth. Mars Orbiter Camera data beginning in March 1999 and covering 2.5 Martian years show that Martian weather tends to be more repeatable and hence more predictable than that of Earth. If an event occurs at a particular time of year in one year, the available data (sparse as it is) indicates that it is fairly likely to repeat the next year at nearly the same location, give or take a week.

On September 29, 2008, the Phoenix lander detected snow falling from clouds 4.5 kilometres (2.8 mi) above its landing site near Heimdal Crater. The precipitation vaporised before reaching the ground, a phenomenon called virga.

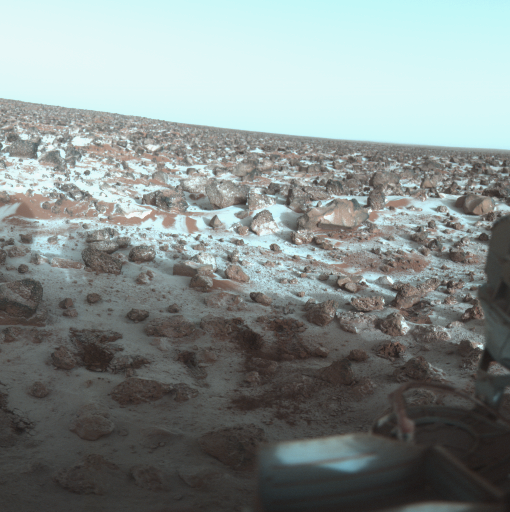
Precipitated water ice covering the Martian plain Utopia Planitia, the water ice precipitated by adhering to dry ice (observed by the Viking 2 lander)

== Clouds ==
Ice clouds moving above the Phoenix landing site over a period of 10 minutes (August 29, 2008)

Martian dust storms can lift fine particles into the atmosphere, where they may provide surfaces for cloud formation. Some clouds have been observed at altitudes of up to 100 km (62 mi) above the planet. Martian clouds can consist of water ice or frozen carbon dioxide (dry ice), and their formation is influenced by atmospheric temperature, pressure and the availability of airborne particles.

Some Martian clouds display iridescent colours, giving rise to the informal description mother-of-pearl clouds. Early spacecraft observations, including images from Mariner 4, revealed clouds high in the Martian atmosphere. These clouds are very faint and are visible when illuminated by sunlight against the dark sky. In that respect, they resemble mesospheric clouds, also known as noctilucent clouds, on Earth, which occur about 80 km (50 mi) above our planet.

Observations by the Curiosity rover in Gale Crater have provided further information about these high-altitude formations. Iridescent clouds observed during early southern autumn have allowed researchers to investigate the size and development of ice particles within them. In January 2025, the Curiosity rover captured images of high-altitude plumes, probably composed of carbon dioxide ice, at approximately 60–80 km, together with fainter clouds at lower altitudes that may consist of water ice. Scientists have not yet established why these carbon dioxide ice clouds have been observed at Gale Crater but not at other locations; gravity waves have been proposed as a possible explanation.

Orbital observations have shown that the amount and distribution of water-ice clouds change during the Martian day. Measurements by the Emirates Mars Infrared Spectrometer over nearly two Martian years found that cloud optical depth was generally greater at night than around midday, with increases during the morning and evening. Clouds associated with the Tharsis volcanoes tend to develop during the afternoon and evening, while nighttime clouds can extend over broader low-latitude regions. These findings show that observations made only during daylight may miss important parts of the daily cloud cycle.

Long-term observations from the Nadir and Occultation for Mars Discovery (NOMAD) instrument aboard the ExoMars Trace Gas Orbiter have also helped establish the seasonal and geographical distribution of Martian ice clouds. Data collected over almost four Martian years show a prominent belt of clouds at low latitudes during the cooler aphelion season, while cloudiness generally decreases during the warmer perihelion season. Clouds have also been detected around major volcanic regions, near the edges of the polar hoods and above the Hellas basin.

One particularly distinctive formation is the elongated water-ice cloud that regularly appears downwind of Arsia Mons. A 2026 atmospheric modelling study reproduced important characteristics of this cloud using a process known as homogeneous ice nucleation, in which ice can form directly from water vapour without requiring pre-existing dust particles. The results suggest that this process may occur under Martian atmospheric conditions, challenging the assumption that airborne particles are always needed for water-ice cloud formation.

Dust storms can also alter the distribution of clouds and water vapour in the atmosphere. Observations of a regional dust storm in August 2023 showed a decrease in water-ice cloud content at altitudes of about 20–40 km, accompanied by the development of a cloud layer at higher altitudes. The study linked these changes to the movement of water vapour into the middle and upper atmosphere, illustrating how dust activity can affect the distribution of water in the Martian atmosphere.

== Temperature ==
Measurements of Martian temperature predate the Space Age. However, early instrumentation and techniques of radio astronomy produced crude, differing results. Early flyby probes (Mariner 4) and later orbiters used radio occultation to perform aeronomy. With chemical composition already deduced from spectroscopy, temperature and pressure could then be derived. Nevertheless, flyby occultations can only measure properties along two transects, at their trajectories' entries and exits from Mars's disk as seen from Earth. This results in weather "snapshots" at a particular area, at a particular time. Orbiters then increase the number of radio transects. Later missions, starting with the dual Mariner 6 and 7 flybys, plus the Soviet Mars 2 and 3, carried infrared detectors to measure radiant energy. Mariner 9 was the first to place an infrared radiometer and spectrometer in Mars orbit in 1971, along with its other instruments and radio transmitter. Viking 1 and 2 followed, with not merely Infrared Thermal Mappers (IRTM). The missions could also corroborate these remote sensing datasets with not only their in situ lander metrology booms, but with higher-altitude temperature and pressure sensors for their descent.

Differing in situ values have been reported for the average temperature on Mars, with a common value being −63 °C (210 K; −81 °F). Surface temperatures may reach a high of about 20 °C (293 K; 68 °F) at noon, at the equator, and a low of about −153 °C (120 K; −243 °F) at the poles. Actual temperature measurements at the Viking landers' site range from −17.2 °C (256.0 K; 1.0 °F) to −107 °C (166 K; −161 °F). The warmest soil temperature estimated by the Viking Orbiter was 27 °C (300 K; 81 °F). The Spirit rover recorded a maximum daytime air temperature in the shade of 35 °C (308 K; 95 °F), and regularly recorded temperatures well above 0 °C (273 K; 32 °F), except in winter.

It has been reported that "On the basis of the nighttime air temperature data, every northern spring and early northern summer yet observed were identical to within the level of experimental error (to within ±1 °C)" but that the "daytime data, however, suggests a somewhat different story, with temperatures varying from year-to-year by up to 6 °C in this season. This day-night discrepancy is unexpected and not understood". In southern spring and summer, variance is dominated by dust storms which increase the value of the night low temperature and decrease the daytime peak temperature. This results in a small (20 °C) decrease in average surface temperature, and a moderate (30 °C) increase in upper atmosphere temperature.

Before and after the Viking missions, newer, more advanced Martian temperatures were determined from Earth via microwave spectroscopy. As the microwave beam, of under 1 arcminute, is larger than the disk of the planet, the results are global averages. Later, the Mars Global Surveyor's Thermal Emission Spectrometer and to a lesser extent 2001 Mars Odyssey's THEMIS could not merely reproduce infrared measurements but intercompare lander, rover, and Earth microwave data. The Mars Reconnaissance Orbiter's Mars Climate Sounder can similarly derive atmospheric profiles. The datasets "suggest generally colder atmospheric temperatures and lower dust loading in recent decades on Mars than during the Viking Mission," although Viking data had previously been revised downward. The TES data indicates "Much colder (10–20 K) global atmospheric temperatures were observed during the 1997 versus 1977 perihelion periods" and "that the global aphelion atmosphere of Mars is colder, less dusty, and cloudier than indicated by the established Viking climatology," again, taking into account the Wilson and Richardson revisions to Viking data.

A later comparison, while admitting "it is the microwave record of air temperatures which is the most representative," attempted to merge the discontinuous spacecraft record. No measurable trend in global average temperature between Viking IRTM and MGS TES was visible. "Viking and MGS air temperatures are essentially indistinguishable for this period, suggesting that the Viking and MGS eras are characterized by essentially the same climatic state." It found "a strong dichotomy" between the northern and southern hemispheres, a "very asymmetric paradigm for the Martian annual cycle: a northern spring and summer which is relatively cool, not very dusty, and relatively rich in water vapor and ice clouds; and a southern summer rather similar to that observed by Viking with warmer air temperatures, less water vapor and water ice, and higher levels of atmospheric dust."

The Mars Reconnaissance Orbiter MCS (Mars Climate Sounder) instrument was, upon arrival, able to operate jointly with MGS for a brief period; the less-capable Mars Odyssey THEMIS and Mars Express SPICAM datasets may also be used to span a single, well-calibrated record. While MCS and TES temperatures are generally consistent, investigators report possible cooling below the analytical precision. "After accounting for this modeled cooling, MCS MY 28 temperatures are an average of 0.9 (daytime) and 1.7 K (night-time) cooler than TES MY 24 measurements."

It has been suggested that Mars had a much thicker, warmer atmosphere early in its history. Much of this early atmosphere would have consisted of carbon dioxide. Such an atmosphere would have raised the temperature, at least in some places, to above the freezing point of water. With the higher temperature running water could have carved out the many channels and outflow valleys that are common on the planet. It also may have gathered together to form lakes and maybe an ocean. Some researchers have suggested that the atmosphere of Mars may have been many times as thick as the Earth's; however research published in September 2015 advanced the idea that perhaps the early Martian atmosphere was not as thick as previously thought.

Currently, the atmosphere is very thin. For many years, it was assumed that as with the Earth, most of the early carbon dioxide was locked up in minerals, called carbonates. However, despite the use of many orbiting instruments that looked for carbonates, very few carbonate deposits have been found. Today, it is thought that much of the carbon dioxide in the Martian air was removed by the solar wind. Researchers have discovered a two-step process that sends the gas into space. Ultraviolet light from the Sun could strike a carbon dioxide molecule, breaking it into carbon monoxide and oxygen. A second photon of ultraviolet light could subsequently break the carbon monoxide into oxygen and carbon which would get enough energy to escape the planet. In this process the light isotope of carbon (^{12}C) would be most likely to leave the atmosphere. Hence, the carbon dioxide left in the atmosphere would be enriched with the heavy isotope (^{13}C). This higher level of the heavy isotope is what was found by the Curiosity rover on Mars. Climate data for the Gale Crater is provided here below, with the seasons normalized to those of Earth.

Climate data for Gale Crater (2012–2015)
Month	Jan	Feb	Mar	Apr	May	Jun	Jul	Aug	Sep	Oct	Nov	Dec	Year
Record high °C (°F)	6 (43)	6 (43)	1 (34)	0 (32)	7 (45)	14 (57)	20 (68)	19 (66)	7 (45)	7 (45)	8 (46)	8 (46)	20 (68)
Mean daily maximum °C (°F)	−7 (19)	−20 (−4)	−23 (−9)	−20 (−4)	−4 (25)	0 (32)	2 (36)	1 (34)	1 (34)	4 (39)	−1 (30)	−3 (27)	−5.7 (21.7)
Mean daily minimum °C (°F)	−82 (−116)	−86 (−123)	−88 (−126)	−87 (−125)	−85 (−121)	−78 (−108)	−76 (−105)	−69 (−92)	−68 (−90)	−73 (−99)	−73 (−99)	−77 (−107)	−78.5 (−109.3)
Record low °C (°F)	−95 (−139)	−127 (−197)	−114 (−173)	−97 (−143)	−98 (−144)	−125 (−193)	−84 (−119)	−80 (−112)	−78 (−108)	−78 (−109)	−83 (−117)	−110 (−166)	−127 (−197)
Source: Centro de Astrobiología, Mars Weather, NASA Quest, SpaceDaily

== Atmospheric properties and processes ==
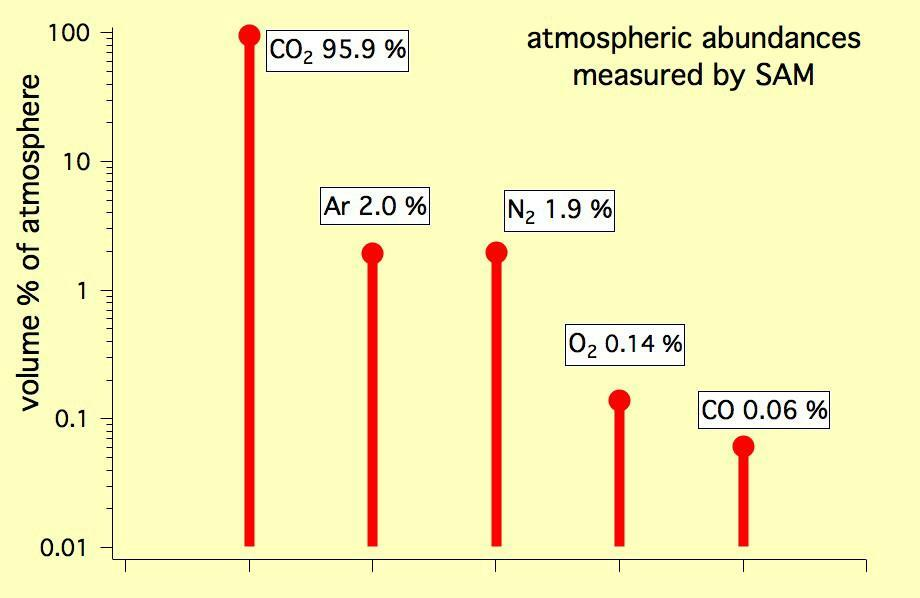
Mars – most abundant gases – (Curiosity rover, Sample Analysis at Mars device, October 2012)

=== Low atmospheric pressure ===
The Martian atmosphere is composed mainly of carbon dioxide and has a mean surface pressure of about 600 pascals (Pa), nearly 170 times lower than the Earth's 101,000 Pa. One effect of this is that Mars's atmosphere can react much more quickly to a given energy input than Earth's atmosphere. As a consequence, Mars is subject to strong thermal tides produced by solar heating rather than a gravitational influence. These tides can be significant, being up to 10% of the total atmospheric pressure (typically about 50 Pa). Earth's atmosphere experiences similar diurnal and semidiurnal tides but their effect is less noticeable because of Earth's much greater atmospheric mass.

Although the temperature on Mars can reach above freezing, liquid water is unstable over much of the planet, as the atmospheric pressure is below water's triple point and water ice sublimes into water vapor. Exceptions to this are the low-lying areas of the planet, most notably in the Hellas Planitia impact basin, the largest such crater on Mars. It is so deep that the atmospheric pressure at the bottom reaches 1155 Pa, which is above the triple point, so if the temperature exceeded the local freezing point, liquid water could exist there.

=== Wind ===
Curiosity rover's parachute flapping in the Martian wind (HiRISE/MRO) (August 12, 2012 to January 13, 2013)

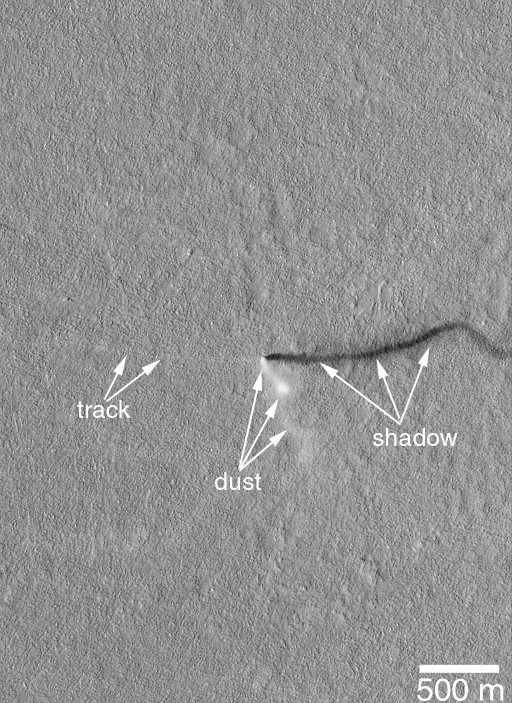
Dust devil tracks in Amazonis Planitia (April 10, 2001)

The surface of Mars has a very low thermal inertia, which means it heats quickly when the sun shines on it. Typical daily temperature swings, away from the polar regions, are around 100 K. On Earth, winds often develop in areas where thermal inertia changes suddenly, such as from sea to land. There are no seas on Mars, but there are areas where the thermal inertia of the soil changes, leading to morning and evening winds akin to the sea breezes on Earth. The Antares project "Mars Small-Scale Weather" (MSW) has identified in 2003 some minor weaknesses in then current global climate models (GCMs) due to the GCMs' more primitive soil modeling. "Heat admission to the ground and back is quite important in Mars, so soil schemes have to be quite accurate." Those weaknesses are being corrected and should lead to more accurate future assessments, but make continued reliance on older predictions of modeled Martian climate somewhat problematic.

At low latitudes the Hadley circulation dominates, and is essentially the same as the process which on Earth generates the trade winds. At higher latitudes a series of high and low pressure areas, called baroclinic pressure waves, dominate the weather. Mars is drier and colder than Earth, and in consequence dust raised by these winds tends to remain in the atmosphere longer than on Earth as there is no precipitation to wash it out (excepting CO_{2} snowfall). One such cyclonic storm was recently captured by the Hubble Space Telescope (pictured below).

One of the major differences between Mars's and Earth's Hadley circulations is their speed which is measured on an overturning timescale. The overturning timescale on Mars is about 100 Martian days while on Earth, it is over a year.

==== Katabatic winds and jumps ====
Katabatic winds, or drainage atmospheric flows, are winds that are created by cooled dense air sinking and accelerating down sloping terrains through gravitational force. Found most commonly on Earth affecting the elevated ice sheets of Greenland and Antarctica, katabatic winds can also be found affecting parts of Mars with intense clear-cut downslope circulations, such as Valles Marineris, Olympus Mons, and both the northern and southern polar caps. They can be identified by multiple different surface morphological features in the polar regions, such as dune fields and frost streaks. Due to the low thermal inertia of Mars' thin CO_{2} atmosphere and the short radiative timescales, katabatic winds on Mars are two to three times stronger than those on Earth and take place on large areas of land with weak ambient winds, sloping terrain, and near-surface temperature inversions or radiative cooling of the surface and atmosphere. Katabatic winds have been instrumental in shaping the northern polar cap and the polar layered deposits, both in aeolian methodology and thermal methodology. It has also been shown that the acceleration of katabatic winds increases with the steepness of the slope and causes more atmospheric warming the more intense the slope is. This atmospheric warming could appear over any steep slope, but this does not always equal surface warming. They also are shown to limit CO_{2} condensation rates on the polar caps in the winter and increase CO_{2} sublimation in the summer. Though quantitative measurements of katabatic winds are rarely available, they remain a highly sought-after element for upcoming missions.

Katabatic jumps are also common in troughs on Mars; these can be described as narrow zones with large horizontal changes in pressure, temperature, and wind speed that require supersaturated water vapor to form clouds and enable ice migration from the upstream part of the trough to the downstream. For this reason, the polar caps see less katabatic jumps in winter, as the seasonal ice cap that covers the polar regions means there is less water ice available to create vapor. However, even when the seasonal cap has sublimated over the course of the Martian summer, the fast winds necessary for katabatic jumps are no longer present, meaning the cloud cover is again negligible. Therefore, katabatic jumps are most commonly seen in troughs during the Martian spring and Martian fall.

=== Dust storms ===
Dust storms on Mars

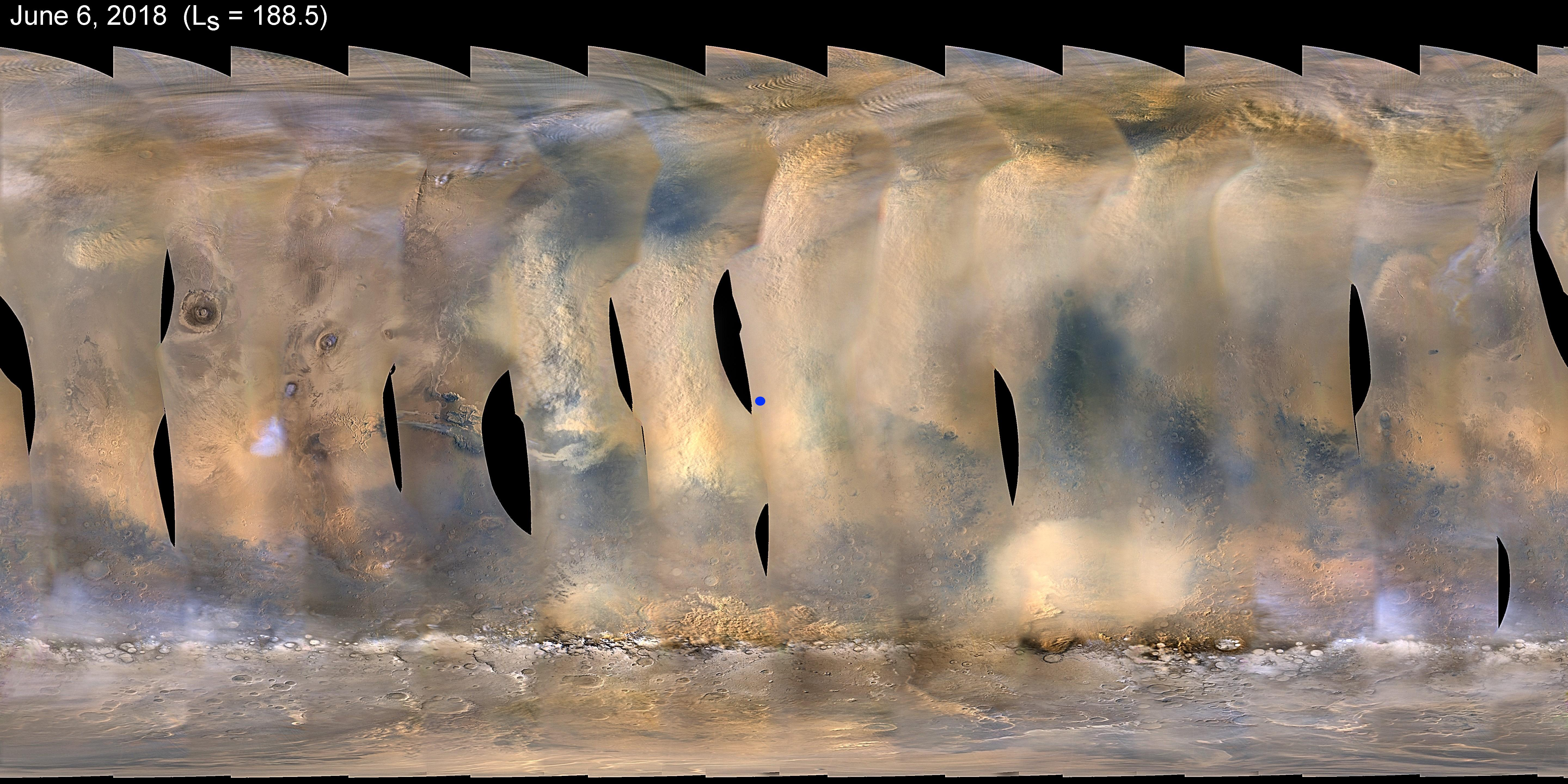
June 6, 2018

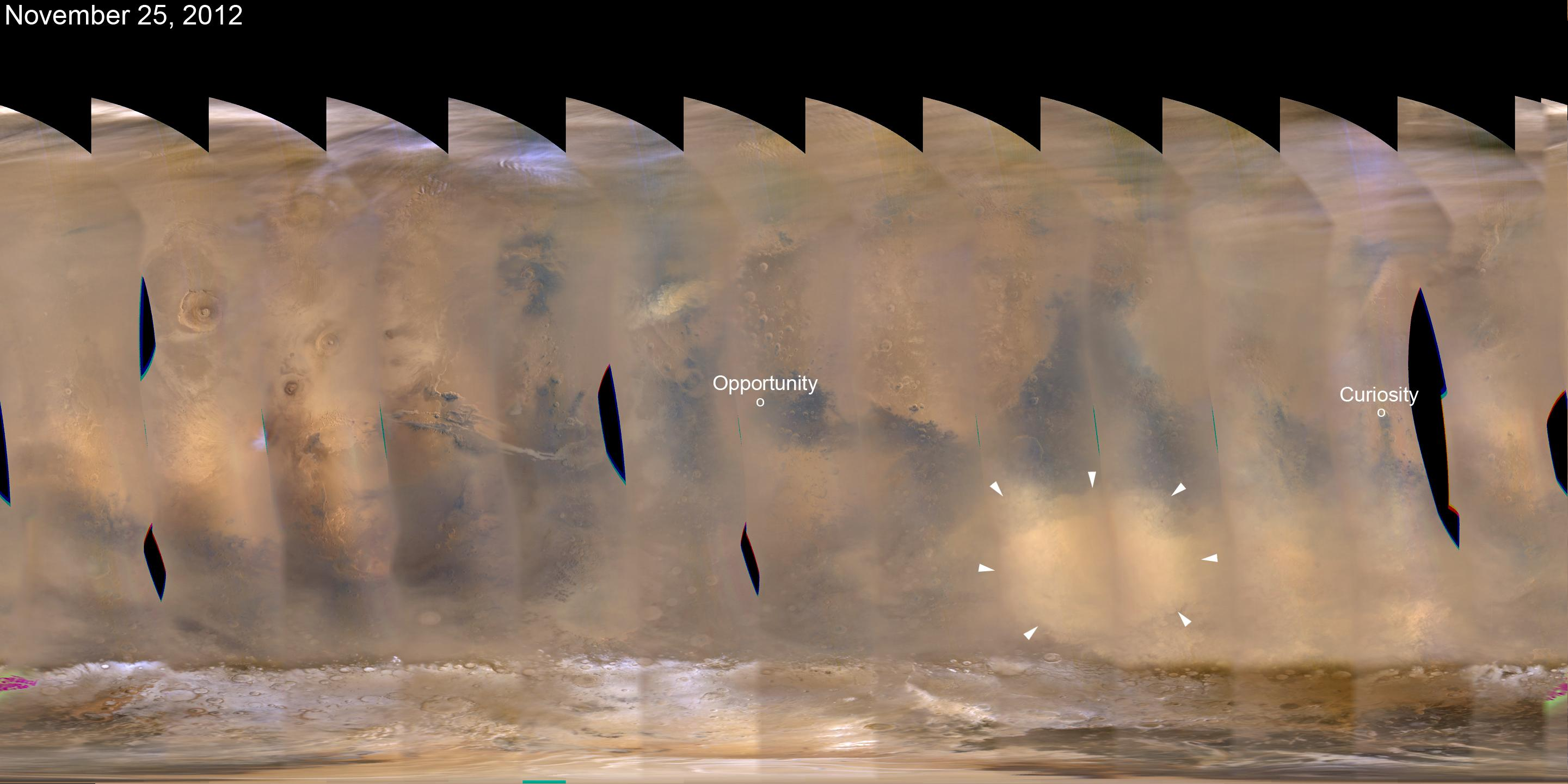
November 25, 2012

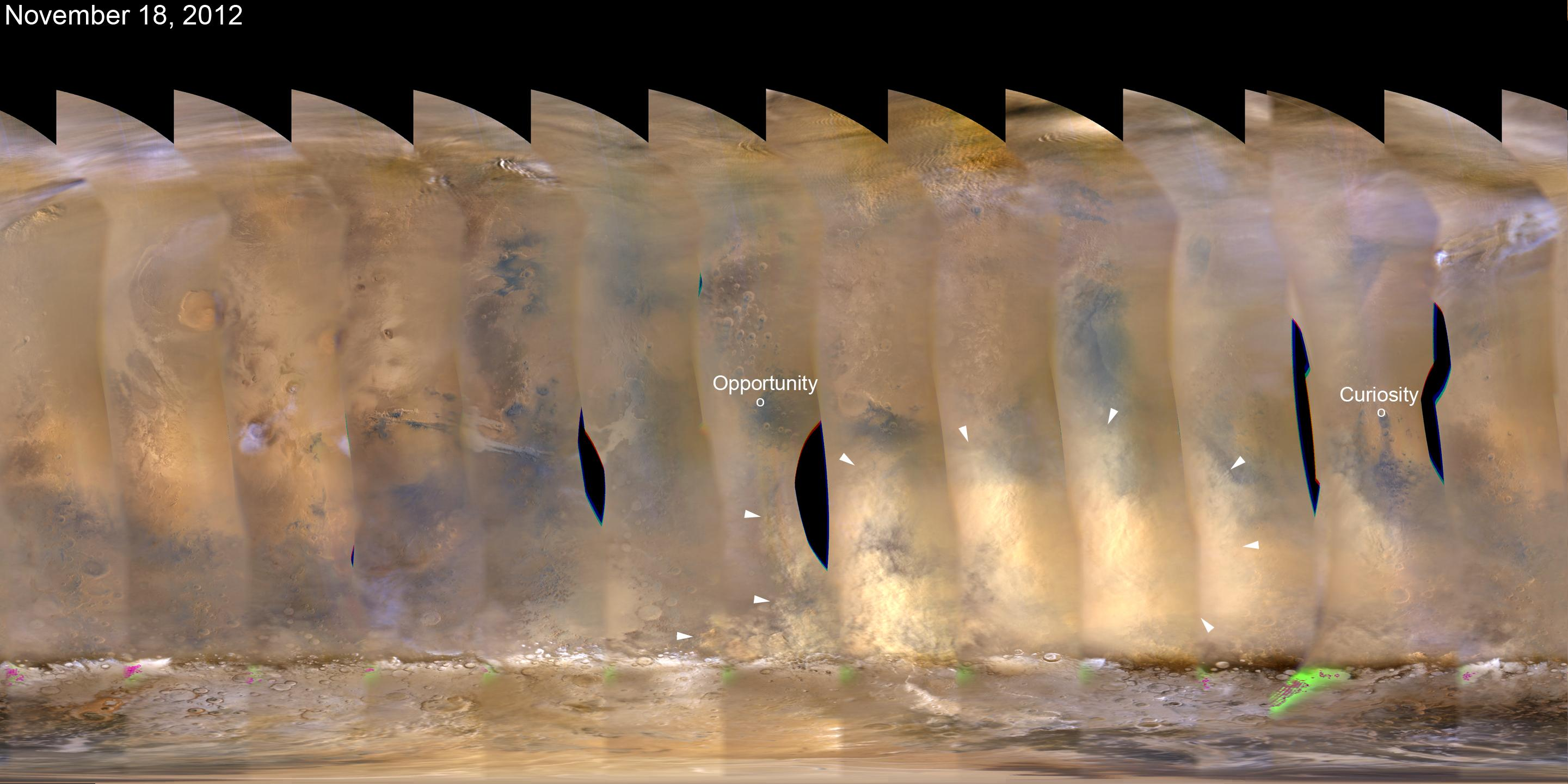
November 18, 2012

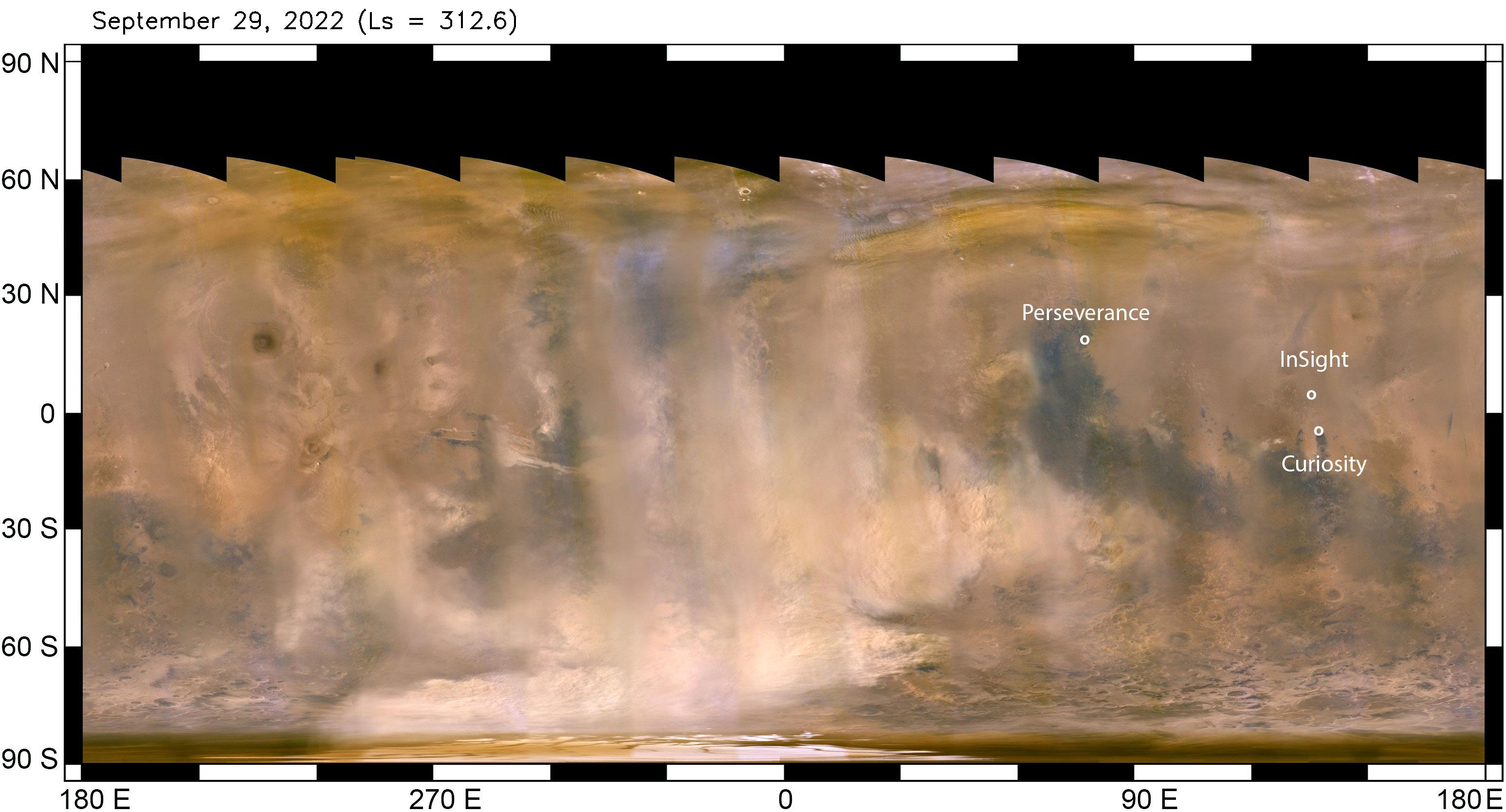
September 29, 2022

Locations of lander and rovers are noted

Mars dust storm – optical depth tau – May to September 2018 (Mars Climate Sounder; Mars Reconnaissance Orbiter) (1:38; animation; 30 October 2018; file description)

When the Mariner 9 probe arrived at Mars in 1971, scientists expected to see crisp new pictures of surface detail. Instead they saw a near planet-wide dust storm with only the giant volcano Olympus Mons showing above the haze. The storm lasted for a month, an occurrence scientists have since learned is quite common on Mars. Using data from Mariner 9, James B. Pollack et al. proposed a mechanism for Mars dust storms in 1973.

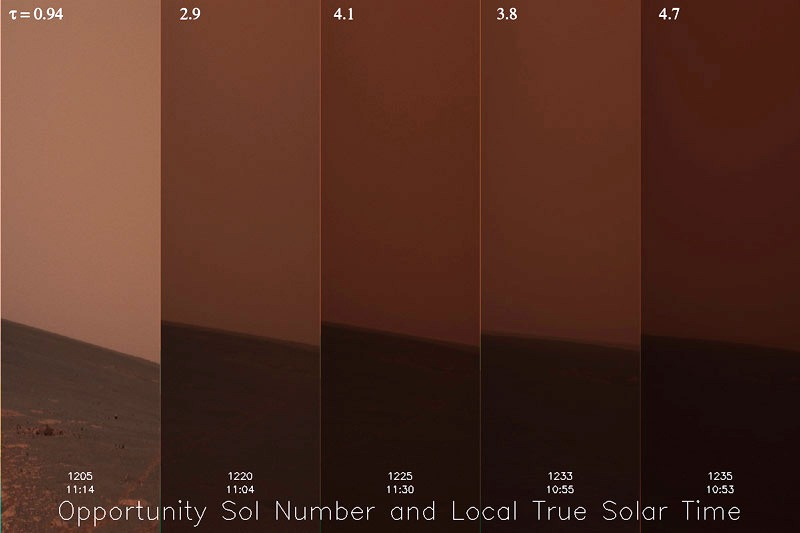
Time-lapse composite of the Martian horizon as seen by the Opportunity rover over 30 Martian days; it shows how much sunlight the July 2007 dust storms blocked; Tau of 4.7 indicates 99% sunlight was blocked.

As observed by the Viking spacecraft from the surface, "during a global dust storm the diurnal temperature range narrowed sharply, from 50°C to about 10°C, and the wind speeds picked up considerably—indeed, within only an hour of the storm's arrival they had increased to 17 m/s (61 km/h), with gusts up to 26 m/s (94 km/h). Nevertheless, no actual transport of material was observed at either site, only a gradual brightening and loss of contrast of the surface material as dust settled onto it." On June 26, 2001, the Hubble Space Telescope spotted a dust storm brewing in Hellas Basin on Mars (pictured right). A day later the storm "exploded" and became a global event. Orbital measurements showed that this dust storm reduced the average temperature of the surface and raised the temperature of the atmosphere of Mars by 30 K. The low density of the Martian atmosphere means that winds of 18 to 22 m/s (65 to 79 km/h) are needed to lift dust from the surface, but since Mars is so dry, the dust can stay in the atmosphere far longer than on Earth, where it is soon washed out by rain. The season following that dust storm had daytime temperatures 4 K below average. This was attributed to the global covering of light-colored dust that settled out of the dust storm, temporarily increasing Mars's albedo.

In mid-2007 a planet-wide dust storm posed a serious threat to the solar-powered Spirit and Opportunity Mars Exploration Rovers by reducing the amount of energy provided by the solar panels and necessitating the shut-down of most science experiments while waiting for the storms to clear. Following the dust storms, the rovers had significantly reduced power due to settling of dust on the arrays.

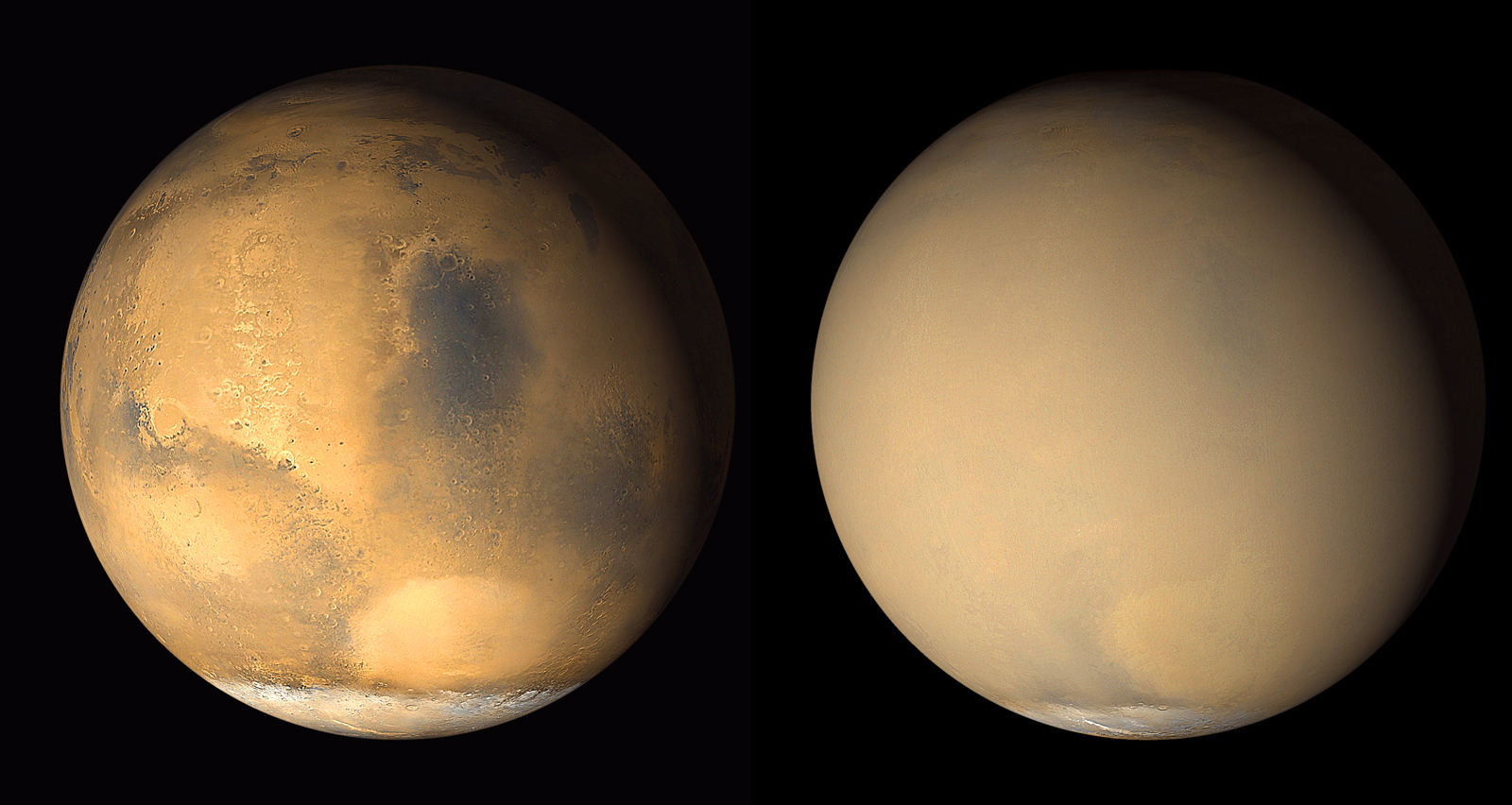
Mars without a dust storm in June 2001 (on left) and with a global dust storm in July 2001 (on right), as seen by Mars Global Surveyor

Dust storms are most common during perihelion, when the planet receives 40 percent more sunlight than during aphelion. During aphelion water ice clouds form in the atmosphere, interacting with the dust particles and affecting the temperature of the planet.

Mars's global dust storms, which can last for months, are often triggered by solar heating near the planet's perihelion, intensifying atmospheric circulation and dust lifting.

A large intensifying dust storm began in late-May 2018 and had persisted as of mid-June. By June 10, 2018, as observed at the location of the rover Opportunity, the storm was more intense than the 2007 dust storm endured by Opportunity. On June 20, 2018, NASA reported that the dust storm had grown to completely cover the entire planet.

Observation since the 1950s has shown that the chances of a planet-wide dust storm in a particular Martian year are approximately one in three.

Dust storms contribute to water loss on Mars. A study of dust storms with the Mars Reconnaissance Orbiter suggested that 10 percent of the water loss from Mars may have been caused by dust storms. Instruments on board the Mars Reconnaissance Orbiter detected observed water vapor at very high altitudes during global dust storms. Ultraviolet light from the sun can then break the water apart into hydrogen and oxygen. The hydrogen from the water molecule then escapes into space. The most recent loss of atomic hydrogen from water was found to be largely driven by seasonal processes and dust storms that transport water directly to the upper atmosphere.

==== Atmospheric electricity ====
It is thought that Martian dust storms can lead to atmospheric electrical phenomena. Dust grains are known to become electrically charged upon colliding with the ground or with other grains. Theoretical, computational and experimental analyses of lab-scale dusty flows and full-scale dust devils on Earth indicate that self-induced electricity, including lightning, is a common phenomenon in turbulent flows laden with dust. On Mars, this tendency would be compounded by the low pressure of the atmosphere, which would translate into much lower electric fields required for breakdown. As a result, aerodynamic segregation of dust at both meso- and macro-scales could easily lead to a sufficiently large separation of charges to produce local electrical breakdown in dust clouds above the ground.

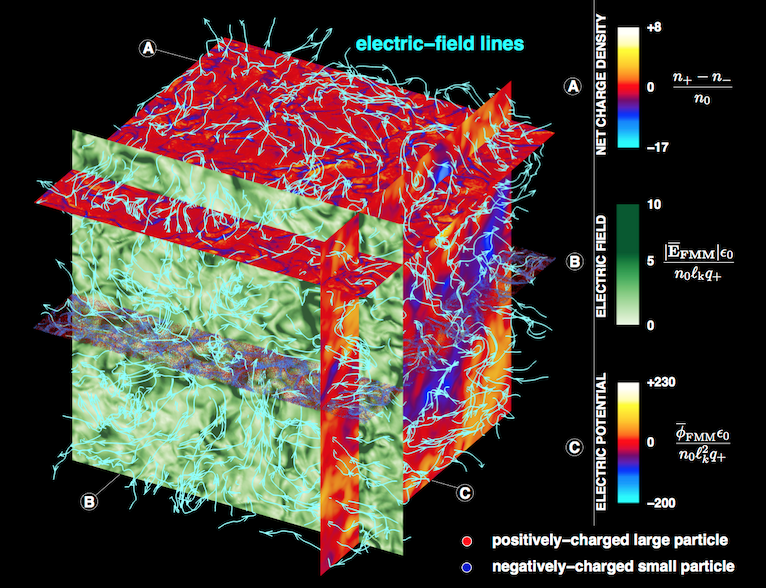
Direct Numerical Simulation of turbulence laden with 168 million electrically charged inertial dust particles (Center for Turbulence Research, Stanford University)

Nonetheless, in contrast to other planets in the Solar System, no in-situ measurements exist on the surface of Mars to prove these hypotheses. The first attempt to elucidate these unknowns was made by the Schiaparelli EDM lander of the ExoMars mission in 2016, which included relevant onboard hardware to measure dust electric charges and atmospheric electric fields on Mars. However, the lander failed during the automated landing on October 19, 2016, and crashed on the surface of Mars.

==== Saltation ====
The process of geological saltation is quite important on Mars as a mechanism for adding particulates to the atmosphere. Saltating sand particles have been observed on the MER Spirit rover. Theory and real world observations have not agreed with each other, classical theory missing up to half of real-world saltating particles. A model more closely in accord with real world observations suggests that saltating particles create an electrical field that increases the saltation effect. Mars grains saltate in 100 times higher and longer trajectories and reach 5–10 times higher velocities than Earth grains do.

=== Repeating northern annular cloud ===
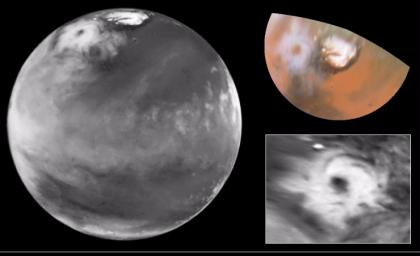
Hubble view of the colossal polar cloud on Mars

A large doughnut shaped cloud appears in the north polar region of Mars around the same time every Martian year and of about the same size. It forms in the morning and dissipates by the Martian afternoon. The outer diameter of the cloud is roughly 1,600 km (1,000 mi), and the inner hole or eye is 320 km (200 mi) across. The cloud is thought to be composed of water-ice, so it is white in color, unlike the more common dust storms.

It looks like a cyclonic storm, similar to a hurricane, but it does not rotate. The cloud appears during the northern summer and at high latitude. Speculation is that this is due to unique climate conditions near the northern pole. Cyclone-like storms were first detected during the Viking orbital mapping program, but the northern annular cloud is nearly three times larger. The cloud has also been detected by various probes and telescopes including the Hubble and Mars Global Surveyor.

Other repeating events are dust storms and dust devils.

=== Methane presence ===
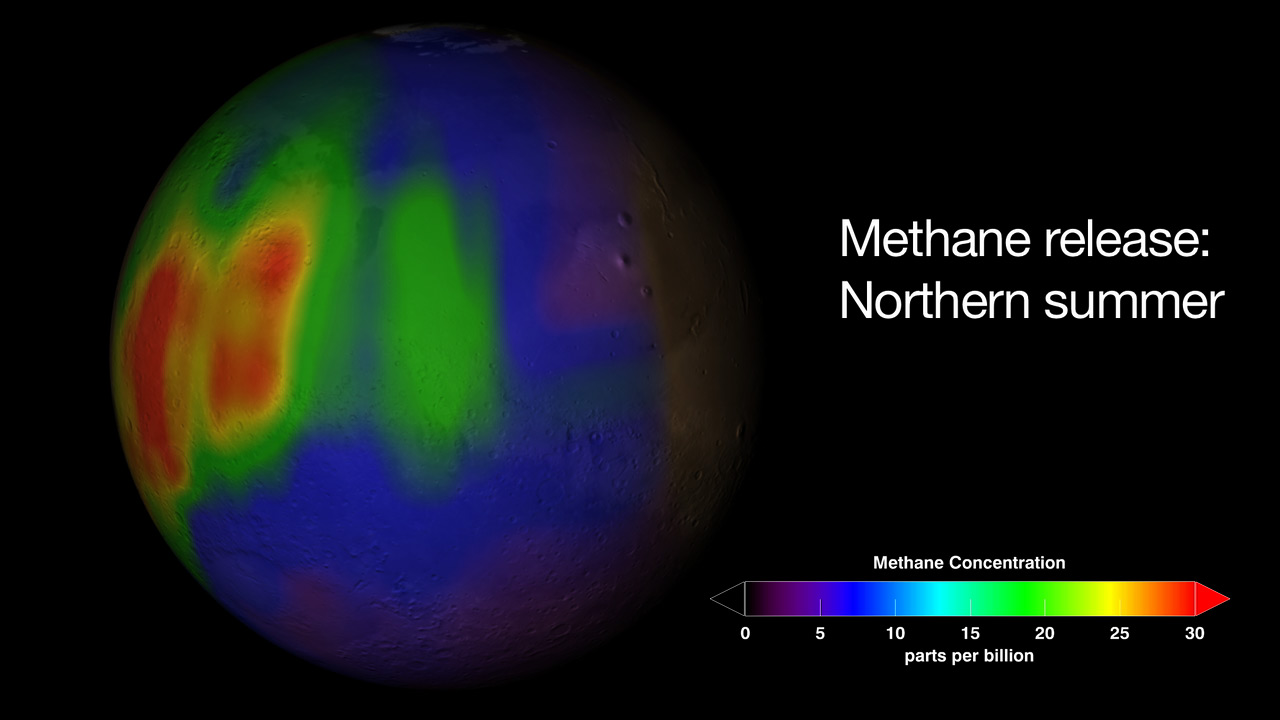
The source of Mars methane is unknown; its detection is shown here.

Methane (CH_{4}) is chemically unstable in the current oxidizing atmosphere of Mars. It would quickly break down due to ultraviolet radiation from the Sun and chemical reactions with other gases. Therefore, a persistent presence of methane in the atmosphere may imply the existence of a source to continually replenish the gas.

Trace amounts of methane, at the level of several parts per billion (ppb), were first reported in Mars's atmosphere by a team at the NASA Goddard Space Flight Center in 2003. Large differences in the abundances were measured between observations taken in 2003 and 2006, which suggested that the methane was locally concentrated and probably seasonal. In 2014, NASA reported that the Curiosity rover detected a tenfold increase ('spike') in methane in the atmosphere around it in late 2013 and early 2014. Four measurements taken over two months in this period averaged 7.2 ppb, implying that Mars is episodically producing or releasing methane from an unknown source. Before and after that, readings averaged around one-tenth that level. On 7 June 2018, NASA announced a cyclical seasonal variation in the background level of atmospheric methane.

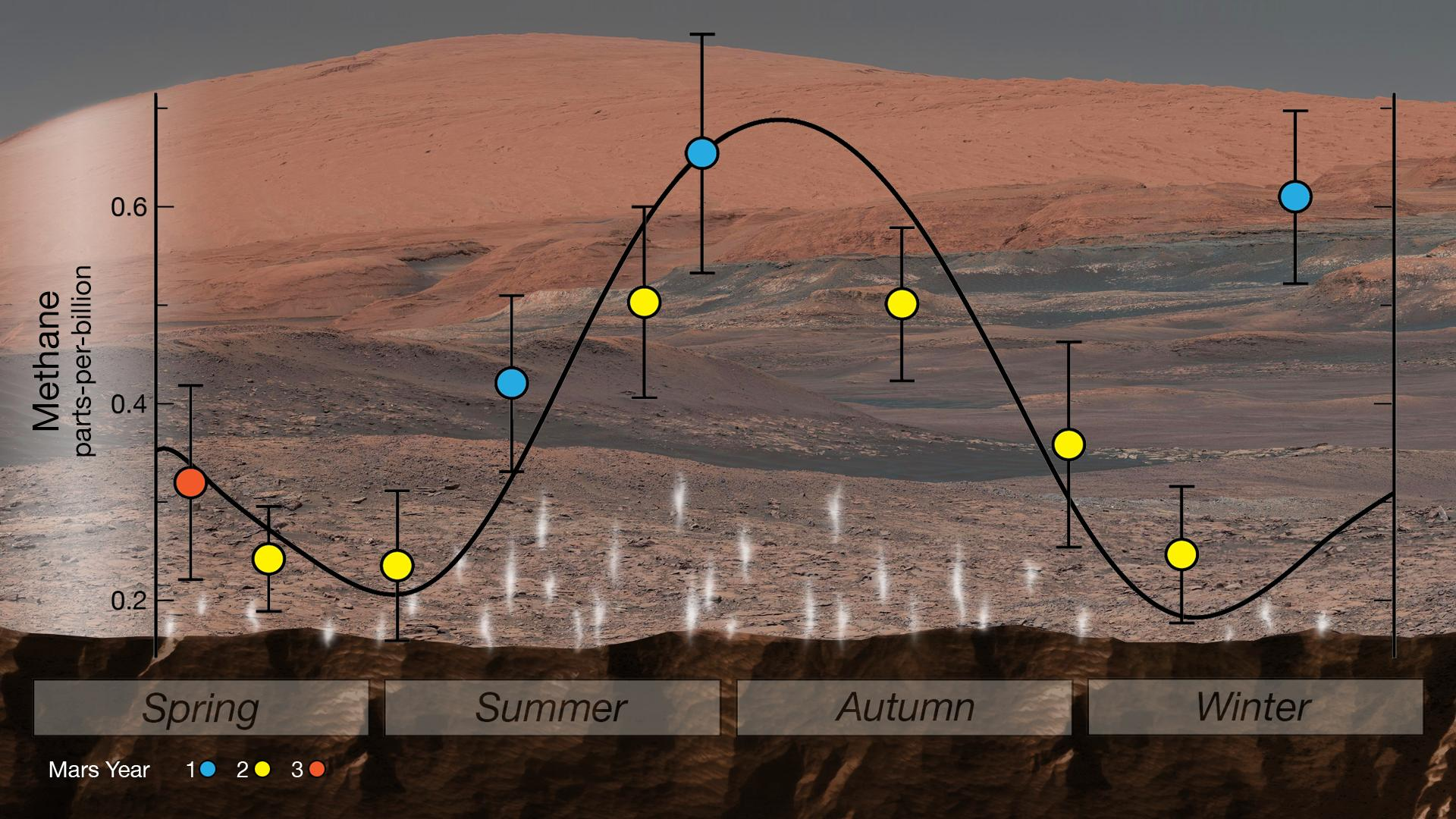
Curiosity rover detected a cyclical seasonal variation in atmospheric methane.

The principal candidates for the origin of Mars's methane include non-biological processes such as water-rock reactions, radiolysis of water, and pyrite formation, all of which produce H_{2} that could then generate methane and other hydrocarbons via Fischer–Tropsch synthesis with CO and CO_{2}. It has also been shown that methane could be produced by a process involving water, carbon dioxide, and the mineral olivine, which is known to be common on Mars.

Living microorganisms, such as methanogens, are another possible source, but no other evidence for the presence of such organisms has been found on Mars. (See: Life on Mars#Methane)

=== Carbon dioxide carving ===
Mars Reconnaissance Orbiter images suggest an unusual erosion effect occurs based on Mars's unique climate. Spring warming in certain areas leads to CO_{2} ice subliming and flowing upwards, creating highly unusual erosion patterns called "spider gullies". Translucent CO_{2} ice forms over winter and as the spring sunlight warms the surface, it vaporizes the CO_{2} to gas which flows uphill under the translucent CO_{2} ice. Weak points in that ice lead to CO_{2} geysers.

== Mountains ==
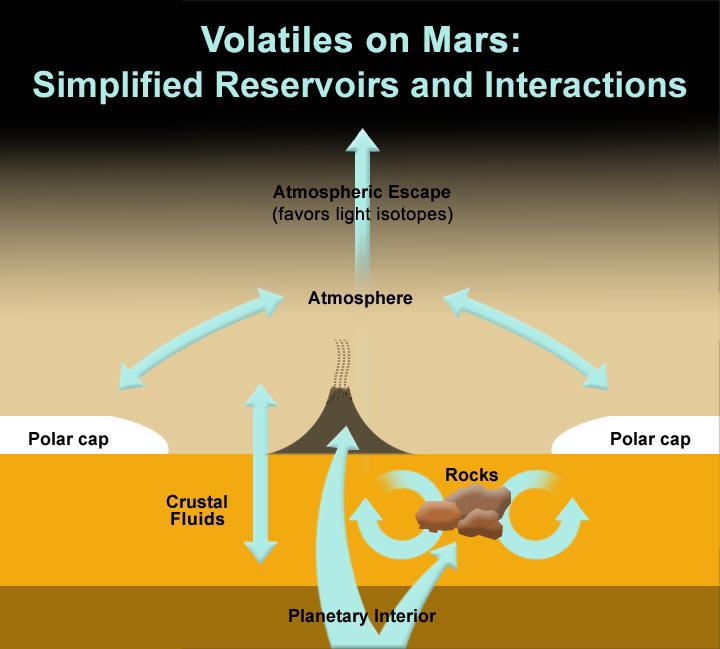
Planet Mars's volatile gases (Curiosity rover, October 2012)

Martian storms are significantly affected by Mars's large mountain ranges. Individual mountains like record holding Olympus Mons (26 km (85,000 ft)) can affect local weather but larger weather effects are due to the larger collection of volcanoes in the Tharsis region.

One unique repeated weather phenomenon involving mountains is a spiral dust cloud that forms over Arsia Mons. The spiral dust cloud over Arsia Mons can tower 15 to 30 km (49,000 to 98,000 ft) above the volcano. Clouds are present around Arsia Mons throughout the Martian year, peaking in late summer.

Clouds surrounding mountains display a seasonal variability. Clouds at Olympus Mons and Ascreaus Mons appear in northern hemisphere spring and summer, reaching a total maximum area of approximately 900,000 km^{2} and 1,000,000 km^{2} respectively in late spring. Clouds around Alba Patera and Pavonis Mons show an additional, smaller peak in late summer. Very few clouds were observed in winter. Predictions from the Mars General Circulation Model are consistent with these observations.

== Polar caps ==
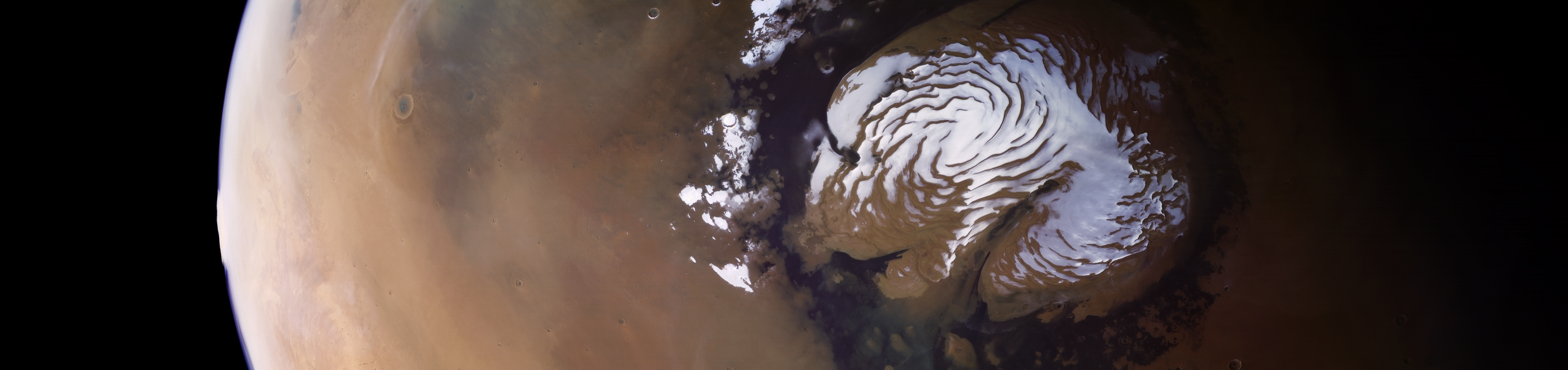
Polar ice cap with the depth of the atmosphere, as well as a large orographic cloud visible at the horizon

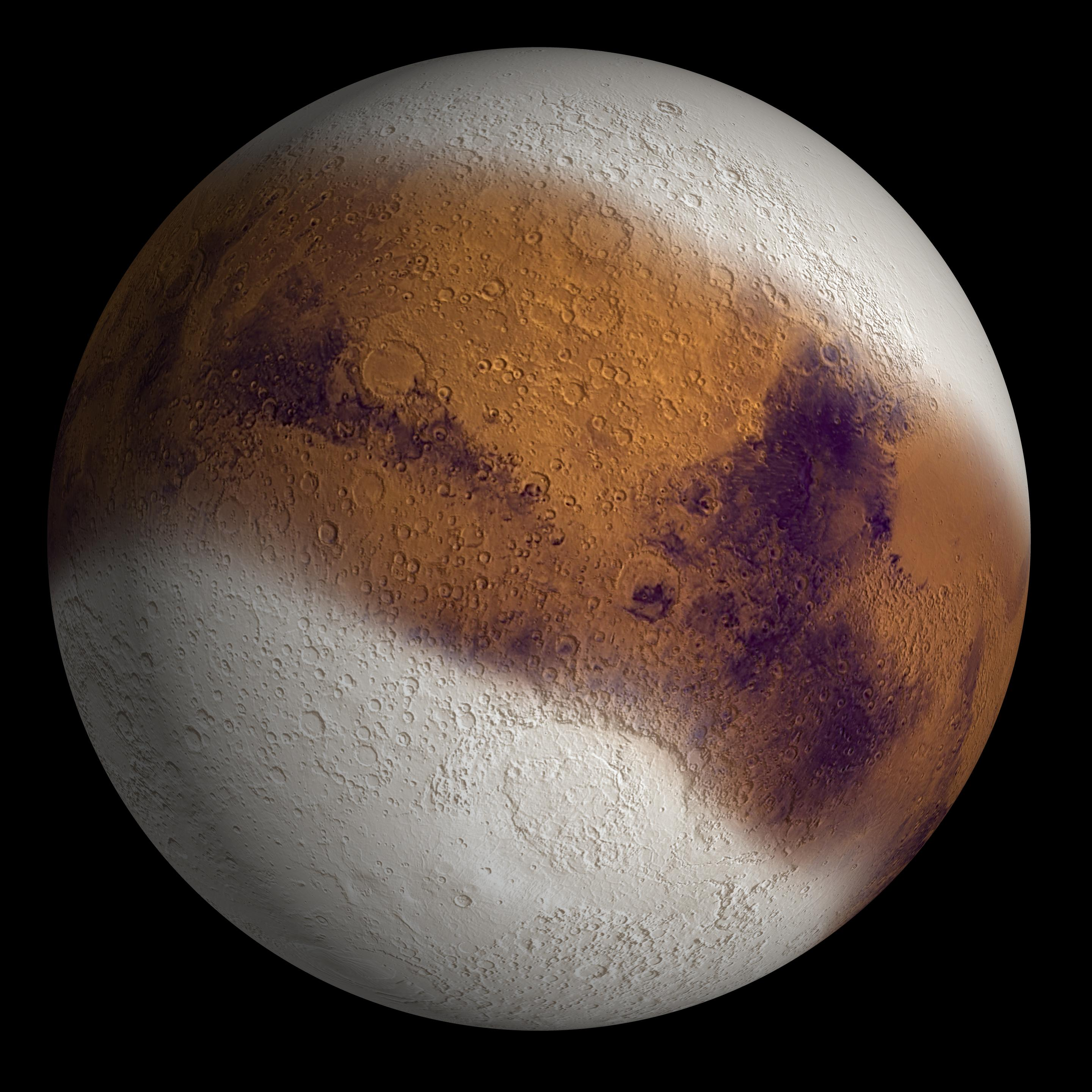
How Mars might have looked during an ice age between 2.1 million and 400,000 years ago, when Mars's axial tilt is thought to have been larger than today.

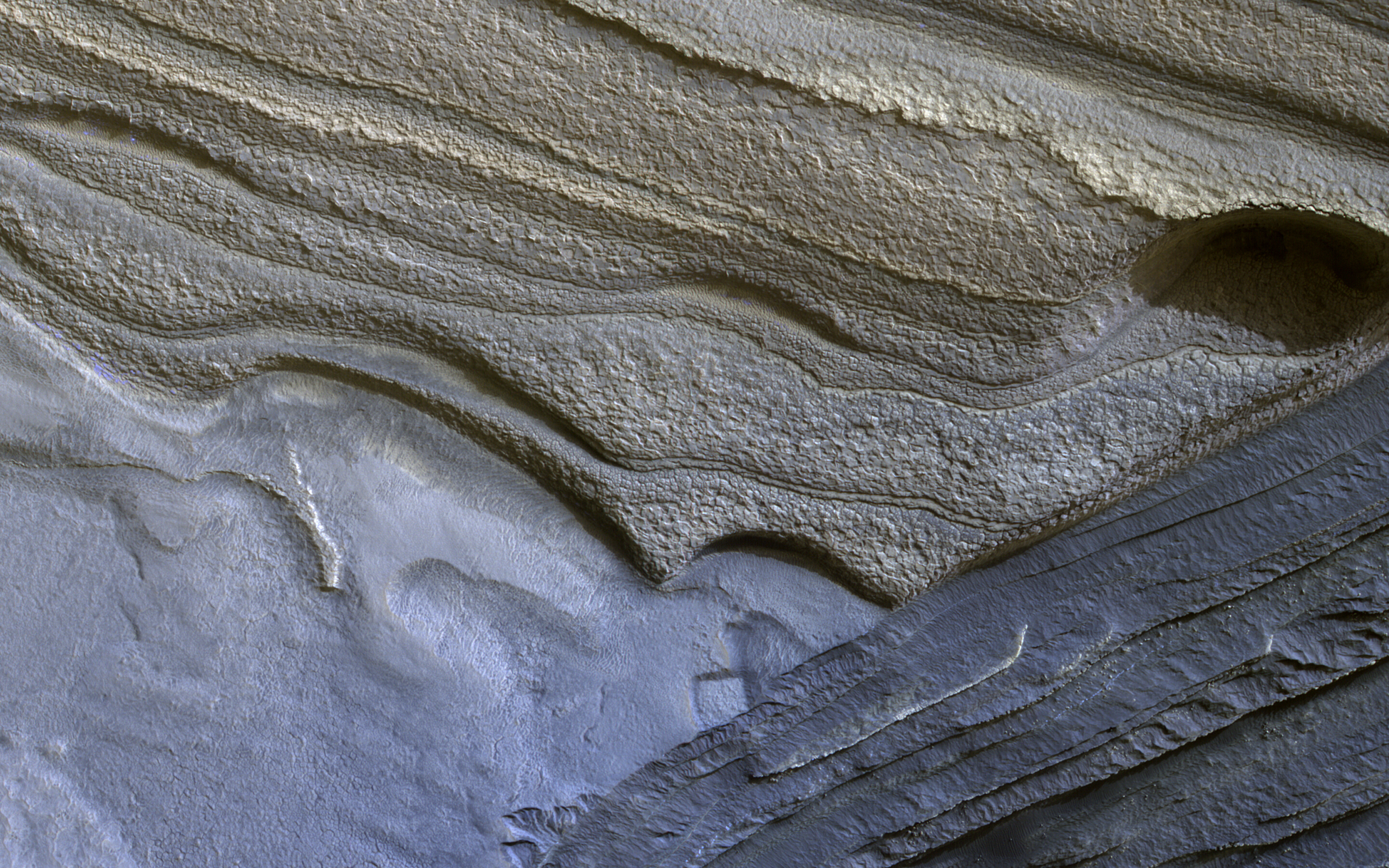
HiRISE view of Olympia Rupes in Planum Boreum, one of many exposed water ice layers found in the polar regions of Mars. Depicted width: 1.3 km (0.81 mi).

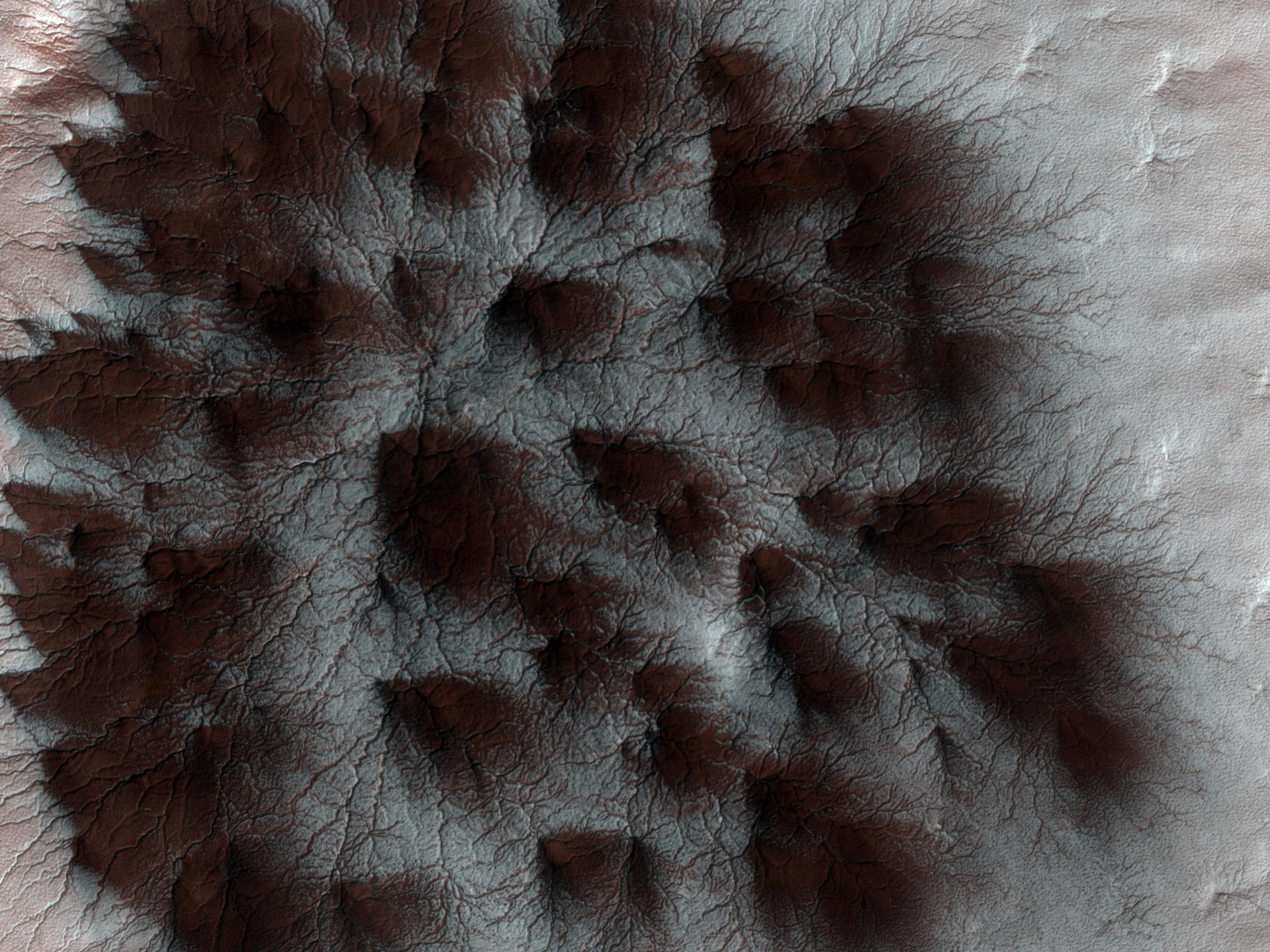
HiRISE image of "dark dune spots" and fans formed by eruptions of CO_{2} gas geysers on Mars's south polar ice sheet

Mars has ice caps at its north pole and south pole, which consist mainly of water ice; however, there is frozen carbon dioxide (dry ice) present on their surfaces. Dry ice accumulates in the north polar region (Planum Boreum) in winter only, subliming completely in summer, while the south polar region additionally has a permanent dry ice cover up to eight meters (26 feet) thick. This difference is due to the higher elevation of the south pole.

Much of the atmosphere can condense at the winter pole so that the atmospheric pressure can vary by up to a third of its mean value. This condensation and evaporation will cause the proportion of the noncondensable gases in the atmosphere to change inversely. The eccentricity of Mars's orbit affects this cycle, as well as other factors. In the spring and autumn wind due to the carbon dioxide sublimation process is so strong that it can be a cause of the global dust storms mentioned above.

The northern polar cap has a diameter of approximately 1,000 km during the northern Mars summer, and contains about 1.6 million cubic kilometres of ice, which if spread evenly on the cap would be 2 km thick. (This compares to a volume of 2.85 million cubic kilometres for the Greenland ice sheet.) The southern polar cap has a diameter of 350 km and a maximum thickness of 3 km. Both polar caps show spiral troughs, which were initially thought to form as a result of differential solar heating, coupled with the sublimation of ice and condensation of water vapor. Recent analysis of ice penetrating radar data from SHARAD has demonstrated that the spiral troughs are formed from a unique situation in which high density katabatic winds descend from the polar high to transport ice and create large wavelength bedforms. The spiral shape comes from Coriolis effect forcing of the winds, much like winds on earth spiral to form a hurricane. The troughs did not form with either ice cap; instead they began to form between 2.4 million and 500,000 years ago, after three-fourths of the ice cap was in place. This suggests that a climatic shift allowed for their onset. Both polar caps shrink and regrow following the temperature fluctuation of the Martian seasons; there are also longer-term trends that are better understood in the modern era.

During the southern hemisphere spring, solar heating of dry ice deposits at the south pole leads in places to accumulation of pressurized CO_{2} gas below the surface of the semitransparent ice, warmed by absorption of radiation by the darker substrate. After attaining the necessary pressure, the gas bursts through the ice in geyser-like plumes. While the eruptions have not been directly observed, they leave evidence in the form of "dark dune spots" and lighter fans atop the ice, representing sand and dust carried aloft by the eruptions, and a spider-like pattern of grooves created below the ice by the outrushing gas. (see Geysers on Mars.) Eruptions of nitrogen gas observed by Voyager 2 on Triton are thought to occur by a similar mechanism.

Both polar caps are currently accumulating, confirming predicted Milankovich cycling on timescales of ~400,000 and ~4,000,000 years. Soundings by the Mars Reconnaissance Orbiter SHARAD indicate total cap growth of ~0.24 km^{3}/year. Of this, 92%, or ~0.86 mm/year, is going to the north, as Mars's offset Hadley circulation acts as a nonlinear pump of volatiles northward.

== Solar wind ==
Mars lost most of its magnetic field about four billion years ago. As a result, solar wind and cosmic radiation interacts directly with the Martian ionosphere. This keeps the atmosphere thinner than it would otherwise be by solar wind action constantly stripping away atoms from the outer atmospheric layer. Most of the historical atmospheric loss on Mars can be traced back to this solar wind effect. Current theory posits a weakening solar wind and thus today's atmosphere stripping effects are much less than those in the past when the solar wind was stronger.

== Seasons ==
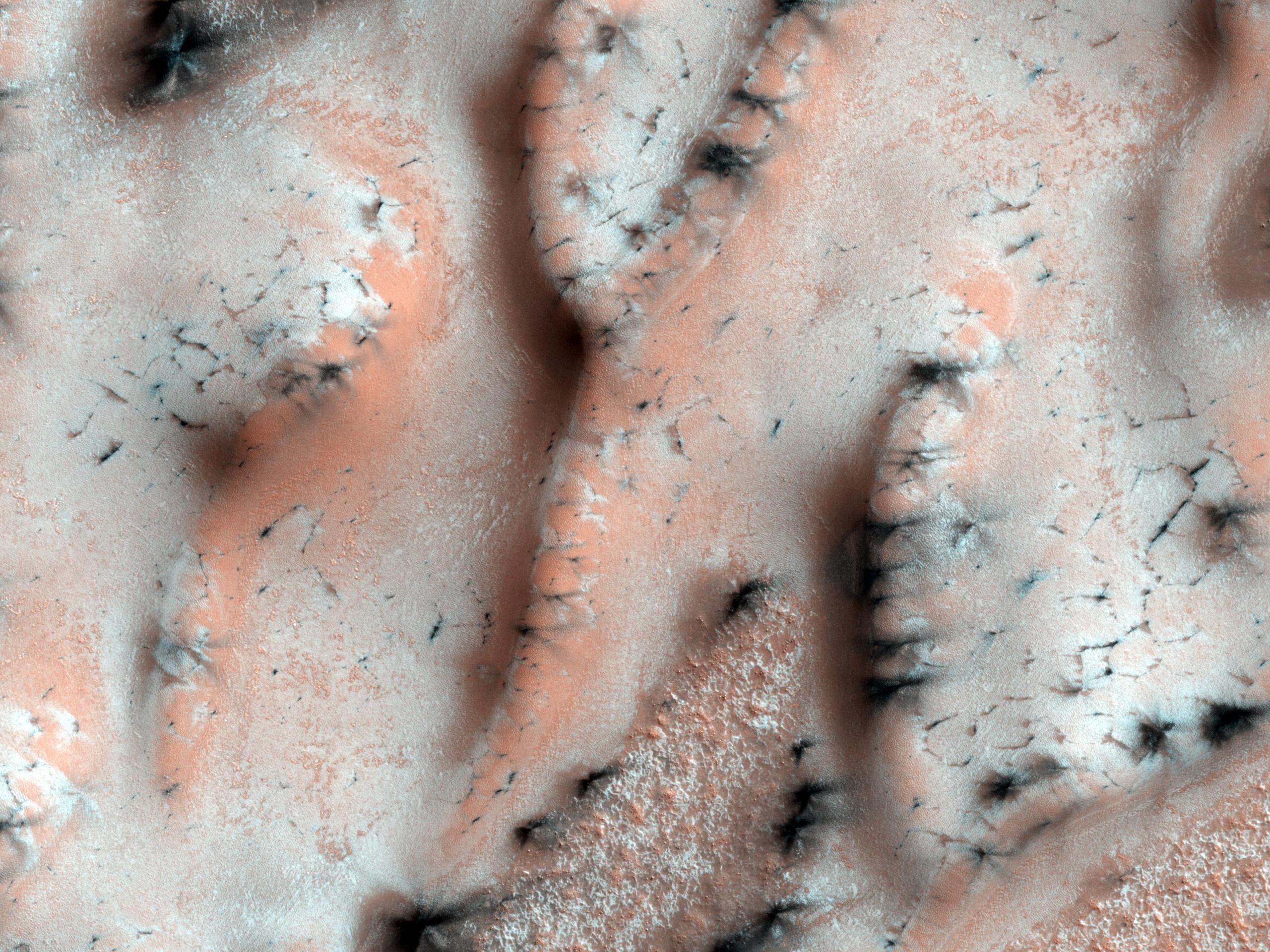
In spring, sublimation of ice causes sand from below the ice layer to form fan-shaped deposits on top of the seasonal ice.

Mars has an axial tilt of 25.2°. This means that there are seasons on Mars, just as on Earth. The eccentricity of Mars's orbit is 0.1, much greater than the Earth's present orbital eccentricity of about 0.02. The large eccentricity causes the insolation on Mars to vary as the planet orbits the Sun. (The Martian year lasts 687 days, roughly 2 Earth years.) As on Earth, Mars's obliquity dominates the seasons but, because of the large eccentricity, winters in the southern hemisphere are long and cold while those in the north are short and relatively warm.

It is now thought that ice accumulated when Mars's orbital tilt was very different from what it is now. (The axis the planet spins on has considerable "wobble", meaning its angle changes over time.) A few million years ago, the tilt of the axis of Mars was 45 degrees instead of its present 25 degrees. Its tilt, also called obliquity, varies greatly because its two tiny moons cannot stabilize it like Earth's moon.

Many features on Mars, especially in the Ismenius Lacus quadrangle, are thought to contain large amounts of ice. The most popular model for the origin of the ice is climatic change from large changes in the tilt of the planet's rotational axis. At times the tilt has even been greater than 80 degrees. Large changes in the tilt explains many ice-rich features on Mars.

Studies have shown that when the tilt of Mars reaches 45 degrees from its current 25 degrees, ice is no longer stable at the poles. Furthermore, at this high tilt, stores of solid carbon dioxide (dry ice) sublimate, thereby increasing the atmospheric pressure. This increased pressure allows more dust to be held in the atmosphere. Moisture in the atmosphere will fall as snow or as ice frozen onto dust grains. Calculations suggest this material will concentrate in the mid-latitudes. General circulation models of the Martian atmosphere predict accumulations of ice-rich dust in the same areas where ice-rich features are found. When the tilt begins to return to lower values, the ice sublimates (turns directly to a gas) and leaves behind a lag of dust. The lag deposit caps the underlying material so with each cycle of high tilt levels, some ice-rich mantle remains behind. Note, that the smooth surface mantle layer probably represents only relative recent material. Below are images of layers in this smooth mantle that drops from the sky at times.

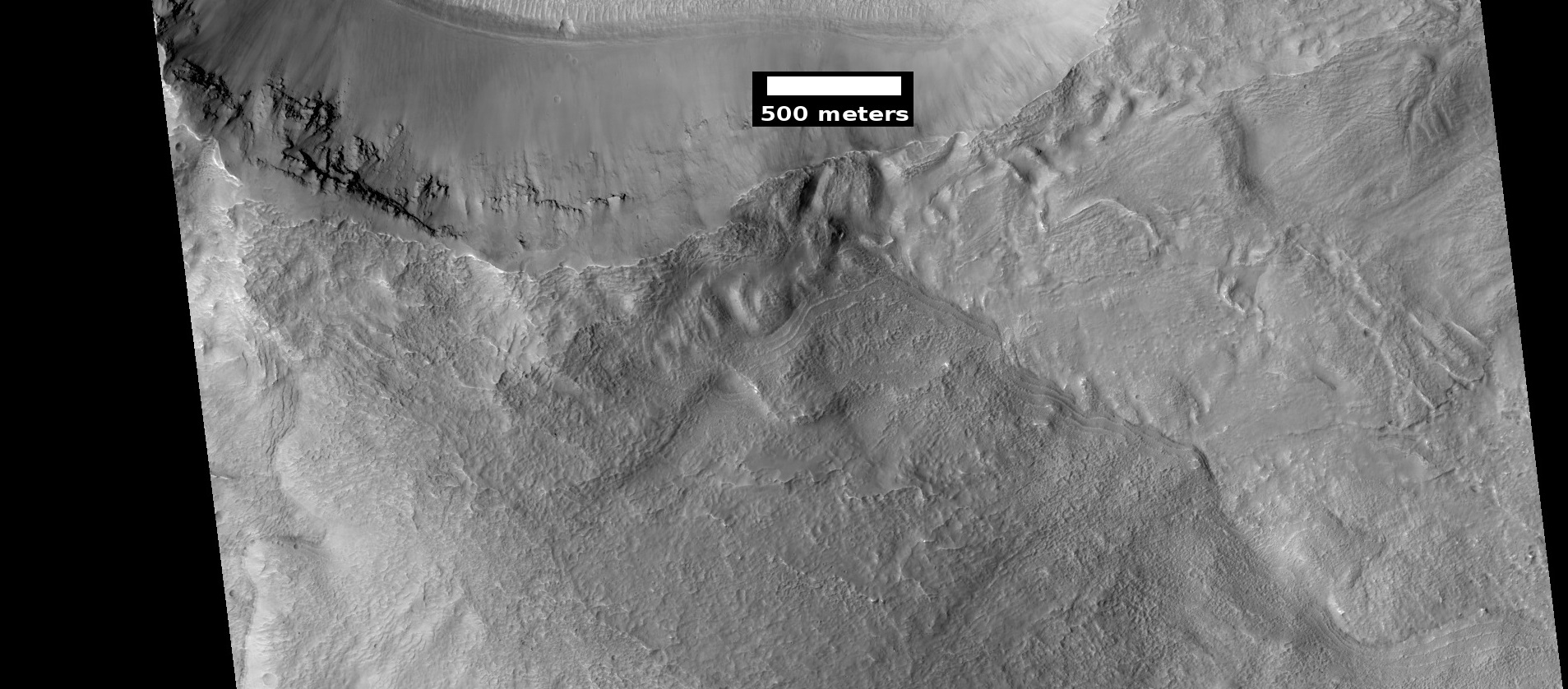
Smooth mantle covers parts of a crater in the Phaethontis quadrangle. Layering suggests the mantle was deposited multiple times.

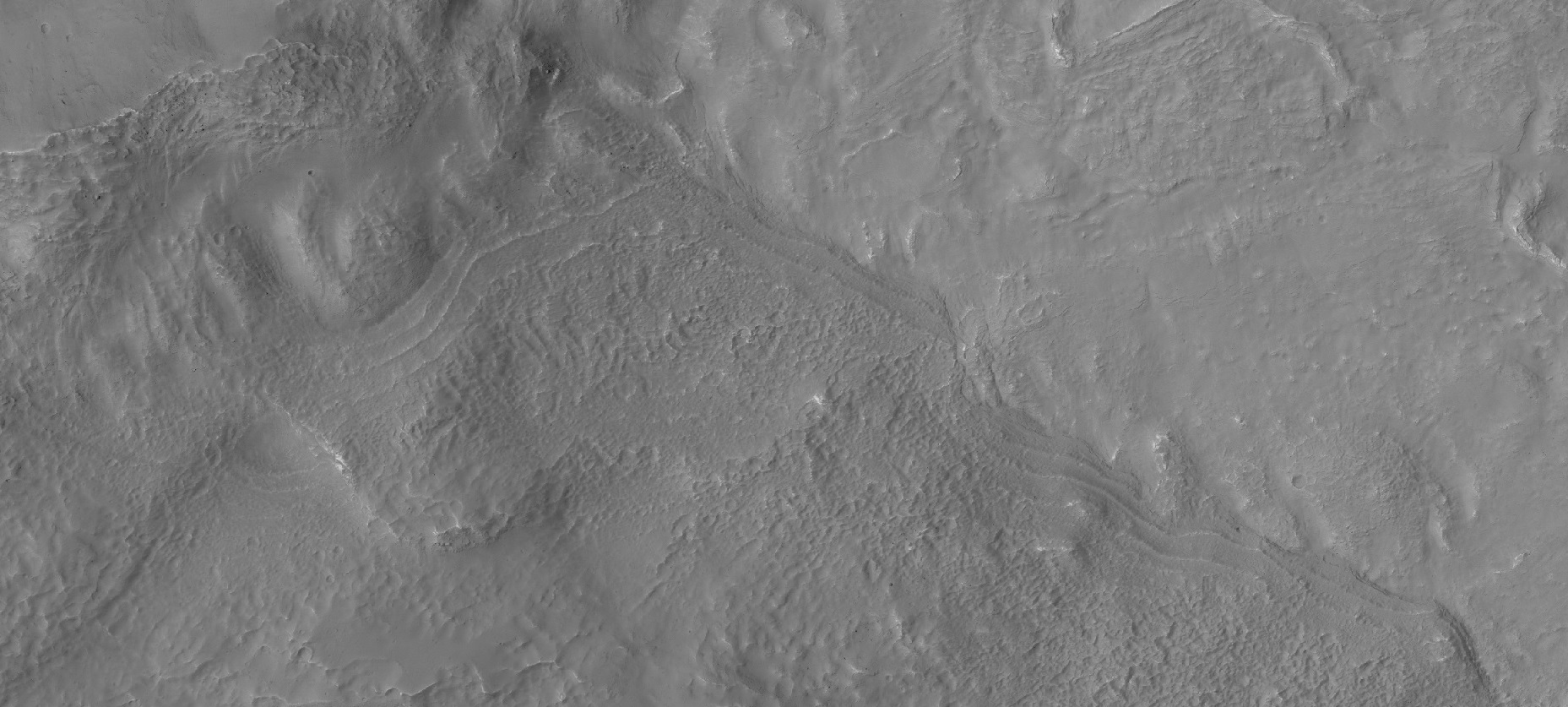
Enlargement of previous image of mantle layers. Four to five layers are visible. Picture taken under HiWish program.

Present unequal lengths of the seasons
Season	Mars Sols	Earth Days
Northern spring, southern autumn	193.30	92.764
Northern summer, southern winter	178.64	93.647
Northern autumn, southern spring	142.70	89.836
Northern winter, southern summer	153.95	88.997

Precession in the alignment of the obliquity and eccentricity lead to global warming and cooling ('great' summers and winters) with a period of 170,000 years.

Like Earth, the obliquity of Mars undergoes periodic changes which can lead to long-lasting changes in climate. Once again, the effect is more pronounced on Mars because it lacks the stabilizing influence of a large moon. As a result, the obliquity can alter by as much as 45°. Jacques Laskar, of France's National Centre for Scientific Research, argues that the effects of these periodic climate changes can be seen in the layered nature of the ice cap at the Martian north pole. Current research suggests that Mars is in a warm interglacial period which has lasted more than 100,000 years.

Because the Mars Global Surveyor was able to observe Mars for 4 Martian years, it was found that Martian weather was similar from year to year. Any differences were directly related to changes in the solar energy that reached Mars. Scientists were even able to accurately predict dust storms that would occur during the landing of Beagle 2. Regional dust storms were discovered to be closely related to where dust was available.

== Evidence for recent climatic change ==
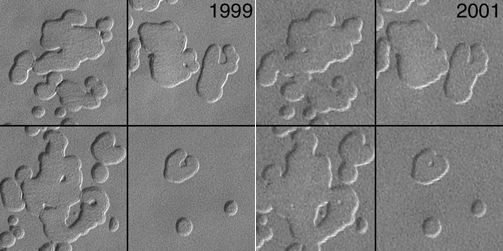
Pits in south polar ice cap (MGS 1999, NASA)

There have been regional changes around the south pole (Planum Australe) over the past few Martian years. In 1999 the Mars Global Surveyor photographed pits in the layer of frozen carbon dioxide at the Martian south pole. Because of their striking shape and orientation these pits have become known as swiss cheese features. In 2001 the craft photographed the same pits again and found that they had grown larger, retreating about 3 meters in one Martian year. These features are caused by the sublimation of the dry ice layer, thereby exposing the inert water ice layer. More recent observations indicate that the ice at Mars's south pole is continuing to sublimate. The pits in the ice continue to grow by about 3 meters per Martian year. Malin states that conditions on Mars are not currently conducive to the formation of new ice. A NASA press release indicates that "climate change [is] in progress" on Mars. In a summary of observations with the Mars Orbiter Camera, researchers speculated that some dry ice may have been deposited between the Mariner 9 and the Mars Global Surveyor mission. Based on the current rate of loss, the deposits of today may be gone in a hundred years.

Elsewhere on the planet, low latitude areas have more water ice than they should have given current climatic conditions. Mars Odyssey "is giving us indications of recent global climate change in Mars", said Jeffrey Plaut, project scientist for the mission at NASA's Jet Propulsion Laboratory, in non-peer reviewed published work in 2003.

=== Attribution theories ===
==== Polar changes ====
Colaprete et al. conducted simulations with the Mars General Circulation Model which show that the local climate around the Martian south pole may currently be in an unstable period. The simulated instability is rooted in the geography of the region, leading the authors to speculate that the sublimation of the polar ice is a local phenomenon rather than a global one. The researchers showed that even with a constant solar luminosity the poles were capable of jumping between states of depositing or losing ice. The trigger for a change of states could be either increased dust loading in the atmosphere or an albedo change due to deposition of water ice on the polar cap. This theory is somewhat problematic due to the lack of ice depositation after the 2001 global dust storm. Another issue is that the accuracy of the Mars General Circulation Model decreases as the scale of the phenomenon becomes more local.

It has been argued that "observed regional changes in south polar ice cover are almost certainly due to a regional climate transition, not a global phenomenon, and are demonstrably unrelated to external forcing." Writing in a Nature news story, Chief News and Features Editor Oliver Morton said "The warming of other solar bodies has been seized upon by climate sceptics. On Mars, the warming seems to be down to dust blowing around and uncovering big patches of black basaltic rock that heat up in the day."

== Habitability ==
Though at its current state, Mars is unhabitable to humans, many people have suggested terraforming Mars to change the climate to make it more habitable to humans. Notably, Elon Musk has suggested detonating nuclear weapons on the ice caps of Mars to release water vapor and carbon dioxide, which he claimed could warm the planet significantly enough to possibly make it habitable for humans, though it has been disputed by recent research.

== Climate zones ==
Terrestrial Climate zones first have been defined by Wladimir Köppen based on the distribution of vegetation groups. Climate classification is furthermore based on temperature, rainfall, and subdivided based upon differences in the seasonal distribution of temperature and precipitation; and a separate group exists for extrazonal climates like in high altitudes. Mars has neither vegetation nor rainfall, so any climate classification could be only based upon temperature; a further refinement of the system may be based on dust distribution, water vapor content, occurrence of snow. Solar Climate Zones can also be easily defined for Mars.

== Current missions ==
The 2001 Mars Odyssey is currently orbiting Mars and taking global atmospheric temperature measurements with the TES instrument. The Mars Reconnaissance Orbiter is currently taking daily weather and climate related observations from orbit. One of its instruments, the Mars climate sounder is specialized for climate observation work. The MSL was launched in November 2011 and landed on Mars on August 6, 2012. Orbiters MAVEN, Mangalyaan, and TGO are currently orbiting Mars and studying its atmosphere.

Curiosity rover – Temperature, Pressure, Humidity at Gale Crater on Mars (August 2012 – February 2013)

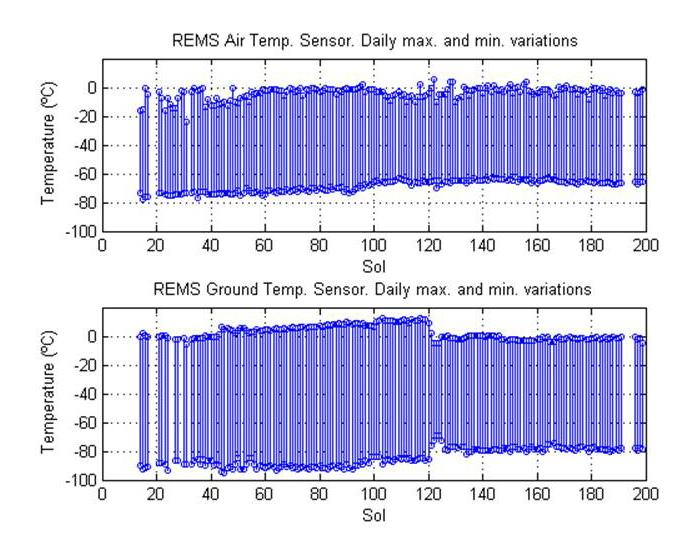
Temperature

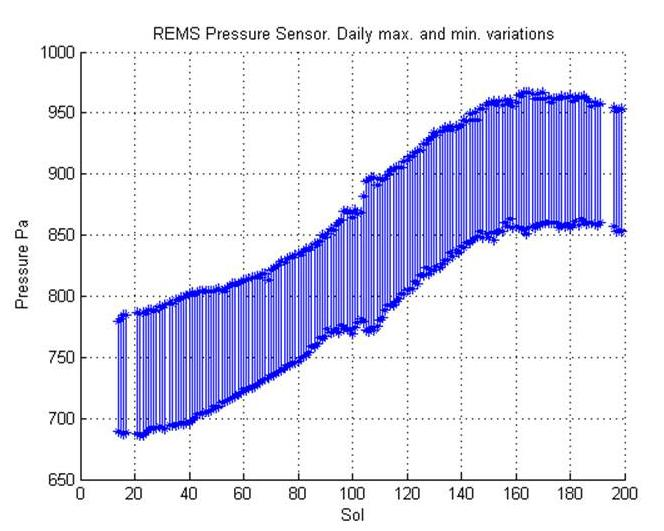
Pressure

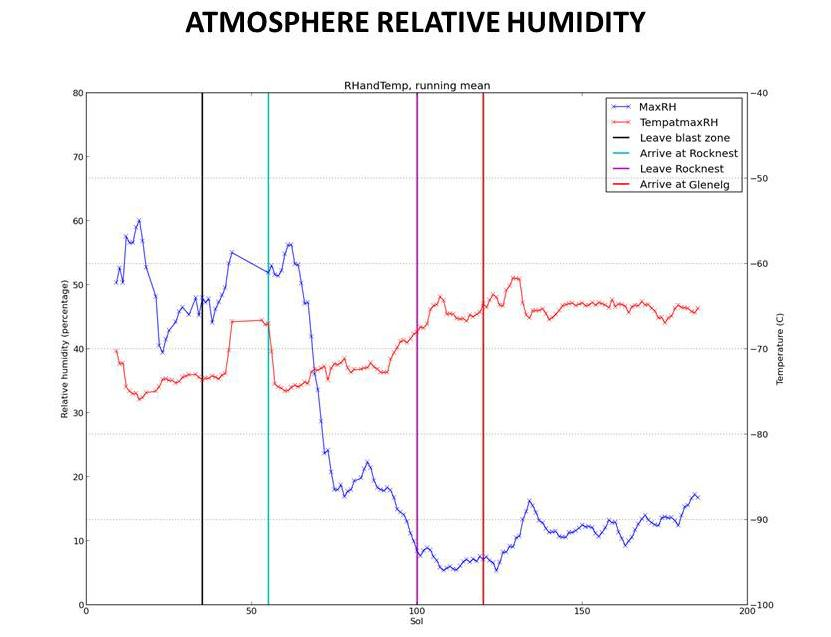
Humidity

- Current Weather Report on Mars by the Curiosity rover
- Current Weather Report on Mars by the InSight lander

== See also ==
- Geology of Mars
- Mars analog habitat
- Mars Climate Modeling Center
- Mars Climate Orbiter
- Mars MetNet, a proposed meteorological network on Mars
- Water on Mars
- Terraforming of Mars
- Mars carbonate catastrophe
