= Martian dust devils =

Weather phenomenon on Mars

A dust devil captured by the Curiosity rover in 2020

Martian dust devils are convective atmospheric vortices that occur on the surface of Mars. They were discovered from data reported by NASA's Viking probes, and have been photographed by orbiting satellites and surface rovers in subsequent missions.

Although comparable to terrestrial dust devils in formation and appearance, Martian dust devils can be many times larger than ones found on Earth. They can be powerful enough to pose a threat to rovers and other technology, although some documented encounters have actually benefitted rovers by cleaning them of dust.

== Observation ==
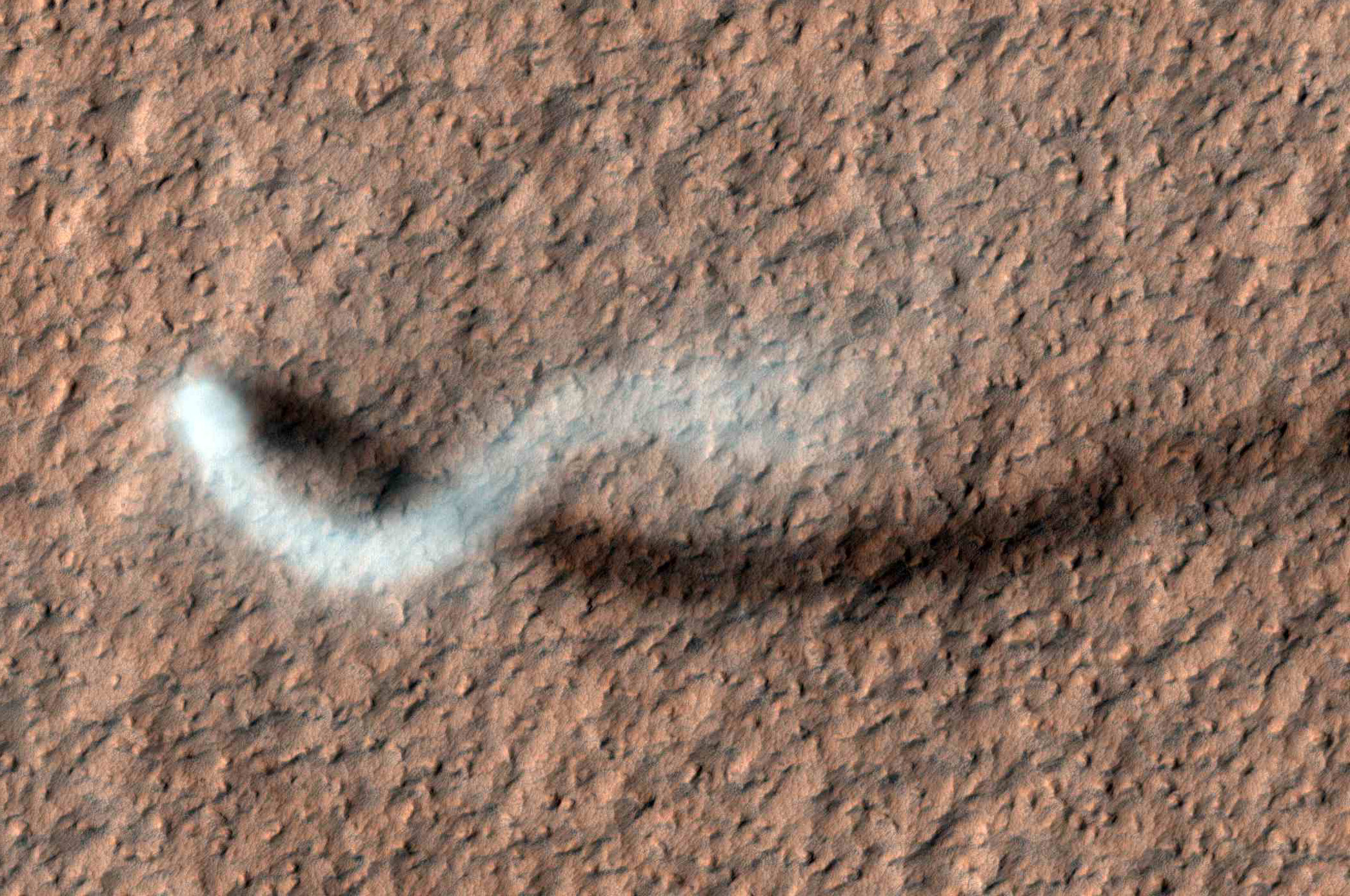
Martian dust devil photographed by the Mars Reconnaissance Orbiter. This dust devil is 800 m (2,600 ft) tall and 30 m (98 ft) wide.

The existence of dust devils on Mars was confirmed by analysis of data from the Viking probes in the early 1980s. Photographs from the Viking orbiters revealed tracks across the Martian surface suspected to be caused by dust devils, and data from the landers' meteorological instruments confirmed convective vortices as the cause. Orbital photographs previously taken by Mariner 9 also showed surface lineations initially thought to be the ridges of seif dunes, but they were also shown to be dust devil tracks based on the data from Viking.

Martian dust devils have since been detected and photographed by both orbiting satellites and rovers on the surface. The Mars Pathfinder rover detected 79 convective vortices through atmospheric pressure data, and imaged several dust devils with its wide-angle camera. On 7 November 2016, five dust devils ranging in height from 0.5 to 1.9 kilometers (0.31 to 1.18 mi) were imaged in a single observation by the Mars Orbiter Mission in the Martian southern hemisphere. On 27 September 2021, the Perseverance rover directly encountered a Martian dust devil, imaging and recording the sound of the vortex as it passed, the first such observation in the history of Mars exploration.

Perseverance Rover recorded a very tall dust devil in the distance on Aug. 30, 2023. It was about 2.5 miles (4 kilometers) away and was moving east to west at about 12 mph (19 kph). Its width was about 200 feet (60 meters). Even though only the bottom 387 feet (118 meters) of the devil was visible in the camera frame, scientists estimated its total height at about 1.2 miles (2 kilometers) based on the length of its shadow---higher than the average tornado on Earth.

== Formation and characteristics ==
Dust devils on Mars form by the same basic mechanism as ones on Earth; specifically, solar energy heats the Martian surface, causing warm air near the ground to rise through the cooler air above, creating an updraft. Horizontal wind then causes rotation, forming a vortex. The lifting of surface material through the vortex creates a visible dust devil. On average, however, Martian dust devils are about three times as large as their terrestrial counterparts. The largest vortices can reach heights of up to 8 kilometers and widths of up to 700 meters, and last more than 25 minutes. The greater height of Martian dust devils may be due to a planetary boundary layer which is several kilometers thicker on average than Earth's.

Whirlwind viewed by the Perseverance rover in 2023

Dust devils occur very frequently on Mars. One team of researchers have calculated a rate of 1 event per sol for each square kilometer of the Martian surface.

As on Earth, they occur during warmer times of year. Research has revealed highly predictable seasonal behavior, with activity escalating sharply just before Martian vernal equinox, peaking in midsummer, and declining after the autumnal equinox. Amazonis Planitia has been identified as the region most prone to dust devil activity on Mars.

Dust devils are believed to play an important role in the climate of Mars. By uplifting large amounts of surface material high above the ground, they may be responsible for as much as 30% of the dust found in the Martian atmosphere, which creates a warming effect and regulates the amount of water vapor in the atmosphere. As they expose lower, darker-colored layers of regolith, the change in surface albedo may alter local climates.

Large dust devils may pose a danger to equipment from Earth. However, some vortices have had beneficial effects. In 2005, the Spirit rover directly encountered a dust devil which blew off the dust which had accumulated on the rover's solar panels, dramatically increasing power levels and enhancing research productivity. Sudden, unexpected recovery of power output was also experienced periodically by the Opportunity and Sojourner rovers, considerably expanding their operational lifetimes. Dust devils were suspected as the cause of these recoveries.

=== Tracks ===
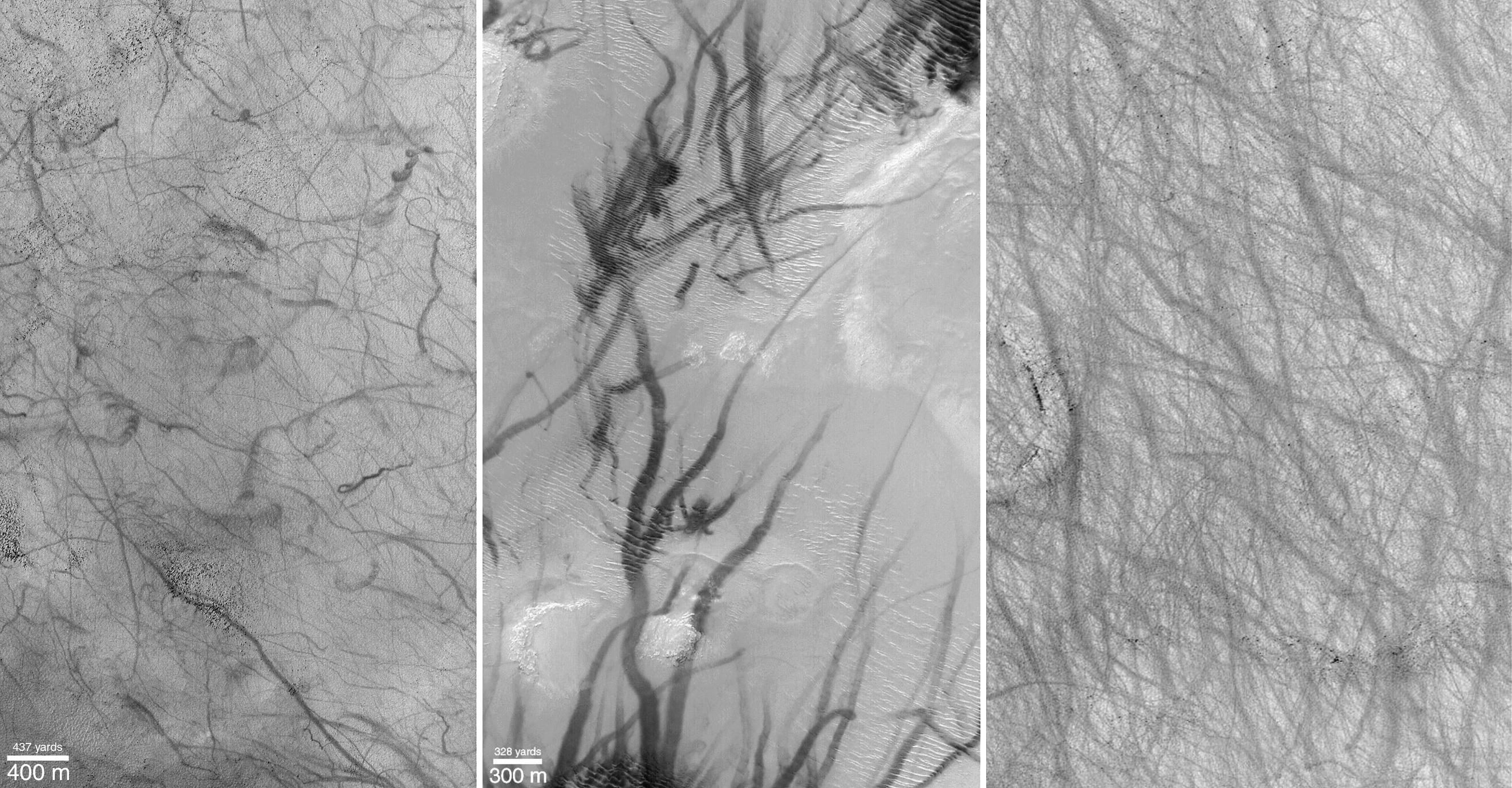
Mars Global Surveyor (MGS) Mars Orbiter Camera (MOC) images of dust devil tracks

The tracks left by Martian dust devils are distinguished by their dark, filament-like appearance, although lighter-colored tracks have also been observed. Their patterns reveal several notable trends regarding the behavior of dust devils on Mars. The paths tend to be straight or curvilinear, and can be up to 75 kilometers in length. Tracks generally run from east to west in both hemispheres, although those in the northern hemisphere frequently indicate a northeast-to-southwest orientation. Dust devils are theoretically expected to move uphill on a sloping surface, or migrate downwind when there is a breeze. Where they are found close together in pairs, they are expected to rotate in opposite directions.

Surface photography has revealed that track patterns are highly transient due to dust storms and other phenomena which frequently erase the tracks, allowing completely new patterns to form.

According to a study by V. Bickel and others, Martian near-surface winds are significantly stronger and more abundant than previously assumed by global circulation models and surface measurements. Tracking over a thousand dust devils revealed winds up to 160 km/h, which are likely a major source of atmospheric dust and provide data to refine climate models. The study found that the diameters of dust devils range from an estimated ~18 to ~578 m, with an average diameter of 82 m.

== See also ==
- Amazonis Planitia
- Dark slope streaks
- Geology of Mars
- HiRISE
- Martian soil
  - Atmospheric dust
