= Mars Climate Modeling Center =

NASA research facility

Coordinates: 37.4088°N 122.0644°W

The Mars Climate Modeling Center (MCMC) is a NASA research facility located at the NASA Ames Research Center in Moffett Field, California, within the Planetary Systems Branch of the Space Science and Astrobiology Division. The MCMC develops and maintains Mars Global Climate Models (MGCMs) (or Mars general circulation models) of the Martian atmosphere, provides climate model output and analysis tools to the research community, and supports NASA Mars exploration missions. Its core functions include conducting scientific research, developing Mars GCMs, providing model data products, supporting NASA missions, and engaging the broader scientific community.

== History ==
=== Origins: The Leovy–Mintz UCLA model (1960s) ===
Mars global climate modeling traces its origins to the 1960s, when Conway Leovy and Yale Mintz adapted the UCLA two-level atmospheric model to study the wind systems, thermal structure, and energetics of the Martian atmosphere. Pollack's first major GCM paper, co-authored with Leovy, Greiman, and Mintz and published in 1981 in the Journal of the Atmospheric Sciences, presented results from a three-layer model that incorporated realistic Martian topography, a diurnally-varying convective boundary layer, and the first simulation of topographically forced stationary planetary waves on Mars. Pollack's scientific vision — that a GCM was an essential tool for interpreting spacecraft observations and guiding mission planning — shaped the character of the group for decades. In his memory, a road on the NASA Ames campus has been named Pollack Road.

=== Establishment at NASA Ames (Early 1970s) ===
Jim Pollack, who joined NASA's Ames Research Center in the early 1970s, recognized the importance of Martian climate modeling for the agency's Mars Exploration Program. Collaborating with Leovy and Mintz, Pollack transferred the model to Ames, where it has continued to evolve ever since. Pollack's role was foundational: his scientific vision shaped the character of the group for decades. In his honor, a road on the NASA Ames campus is named Pollack Road.

=== Model development through the 1980s and 1990s ===
Through the early 1980s it became increasingly clear that atmospheric dust plays a fundamental role in the atmosphere of Mars and in the development of global-scale dust storms. In response, researchers implemented dust radiative-heating algorithms into the model, increased the number of vertical layers from three to thirteen, and developed several new diagnostic packages. These advances continued through the late 1980s and early 1990s.

When Pollack fell ill in 1992 and passed away in 1993, Bob Haberle assumed leadership of the effort and continued with Pollack's plans to improve the physics packages and to maintain active involvement in NASA Mars missions. During the 1990s the model's radiation code and boundary-layer scheme were upgraded, and a new dynamical core with a tracer-transport scheme was developed. By the early 2000s, Mars GCMs had shifted toward multi-annual simulations with tracer-transport capabilities, more sophisticated cloud microphysics, and improved dust-lifting schemes.

=== Formal development of the MCMC (2007–2018) ===
Jeff Hollingsworth took over leadership of the Ames Mars GCM group in spring 2007 and led the group through a period of growth. He worked closely with NASA Headquarters to formally establish the Mars Climate Modeling Center as a NASA facility dedicated to providing model products and services to the community.

=== Current leadership (2019–present) ===
In January 2019, Melinda Kahre assumed leadership of the MCMC. Under her direction, the group has continued to expand. Kahre initiated the transition from the older Goddard C-grid dynamical core (the "Legacy MGCM") to the NOAA/GFDL cubed-sphere finite-volume ("FV3") dynamical core, which enables higher-resolution simulations. She has led the development of the new FV3-based Mars GCM (the "Ames MGCM"), which supports high-resolution science and mission-support applications, and has championed the public release of source code for both the Legacy GCM and the FV3-based GCM, as well as analysis tools and model output. The MCMC has been built on a rich tradition of training students, postdoctoral researchers, research associates, and civil servants. Students from high school through graduate level have contributed meaningfully to the group's scientific and technical goals, and several current team members advanced through successive positions within the MCMC itself.

== Legacy Mars GCM ==
The Ames Legacy Mars GCM represents the culmination of more than five decades of incremental development beginning with the Leovy–Mintz UCLA model. It uses the Goddard C-grid dynamical core and includes parameterizations of dust radiative heating, boundary-layer processes, cloud microphysics, tracer transport, and dust-lifting mechanisms, among others. The Legacy model has been used to study the current climate of Mars as well as scenarios relevant to past climates and potential future states.

== Ames Mars GCM ==
The newer Ames Mars GCM was developed under Kahre's leadership. Its dynamical core is derived from the NOAA Geophysical Fluid Dynamics Laboratory (GFDL) cubed-sphere finite-volume (FV3) framework, the same core used in NOAA's operational weather prediction models on Earth. Coupled with the Ames Legacy GCM physics package and enhanced with newer physics parameterizations, this configuration enables higher-resolution simulations that are important for both scientific research and mission-support applications such as entry, descent, and landing (EDL) planning and landing-site selection. MCMC members have transitioned to using the Ames MGCM as the primary model for studies of the current climate and past climate of Mars (see the following peer-reviewed modeling studies: )

== Physical processes and dynamical frameworks ==
The MCMC develops numerical schemes representative of the Martian atmosphere and tests the applicability of various dynamical frameworks for the Mars GCM. Physical parameterizations include radiative transfer (accounting for dust aerosols, CO_{2} gas, and water ice clouds), boundary-layer turbulence, cloud microphysics (water ice and CO_{2} ice nucleation, growth, and sedimentation), dust lifting and settling, volatile (CO_{2} and water) cycles, and tracer transport for photochemical species and biocontaminants. The group continually evaluates new physical schemes by comparing model output against observations from orbital instruments — including the TES on Mars Global Surveyor, the MCS on Mars Reconnaissance Orbiter, and MAVEN — as well as surface landers and rovers such as Curiosity and Perseverance.

== Mission support ==
The MCMC provides model products directly in support of NASA Mars missions. Atmospheric data from the GCMs inform entry, descent, and landing (EDL) analyses, landing site selection, surface habitat design for human exploration, and planetary protection studies. The center has supported missions including the Mars Science Laboratory (Curiosity), Mars 2020 (Perseverance), and planning activities for future human missions to Mars.

== Community Analysis Pipeline ==
The Community Analysis Pipeline (CAP) is an open-source, Python software toolkit developed by the MCMC to facilitate analysis and visualization of Mars GCM output. CAP provides a standardized interface for reading, processing, and plotting NetCDF-format model output files from not only the MCMC's GCMs, but also MarsWRF, EMARS, LMD PCM, and OpenMars. It is designed to be accessible to users with varying levels of numerical modeling experience, including students and researchers new to planetary climate modeling.

== Modeling tutorials ==
The MCMC has hosted a series of tutorials to train the broader community in the use of both the Mars GCMs and CAP analysis tool. Past tutorials have been held virtually and in-person and are open to students, researchers, and instructors of varying experience levels.A notable example was the CAP and Mars GCM Tutorial, held virtually November 13–15, 2023. This tutorial covered two areas:

1. Analyzing GCM output using CAP, and

2. Running the new FV3-based Mars GCM.

Participants were given access to NASA's Science Managed Cloud Environment (SMCE) to conduct hands-on computing sessions. The event was open to students, teachers, and researchers with a range of modeling backgrounds. An earlier tutorial, the NASA/Ames Legacy Mars GCM Tutorial, held virtually November 2–4, 2021, focused on teaching new users how to run and analyze output from the Legacy model.
