= Mars Surveyor =

Mars Surveyor may refer to various NASA Mars probes:

- Mars Global Surveyor, single orbiter launched in 1996
- Mars Surveyor 1998, where NASA lost both probes:
  - Mars Climate Orbiter (formerly the Mars Surveyor '98 Orbiter), and
  - Mars Polar Lander (formerly the Mars Surveyor '98 Lander)
- Mars Surveyor 2001, of which there were also to be two probes:
  - 2001 Mars Odyssey (formerly Mars Surveyor 2001 Orbiter), currently orbiting Mars, and
  - Mars Surveyor 2001 Lander, cancelled in May 2000
