= Mars Surveyor 2001 =

Cancelled NASA spaceflight mission in the Mars Exploration Program

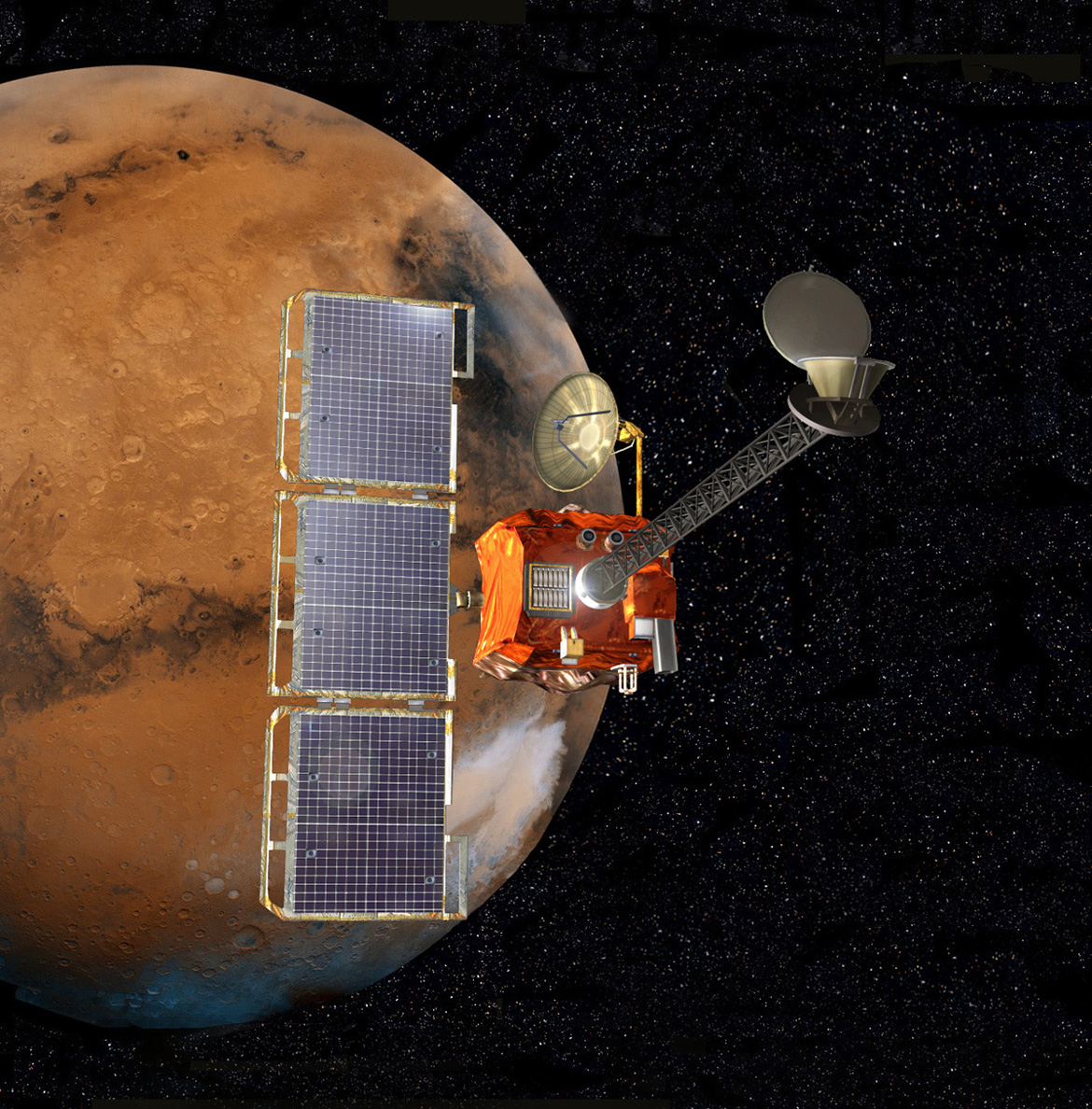
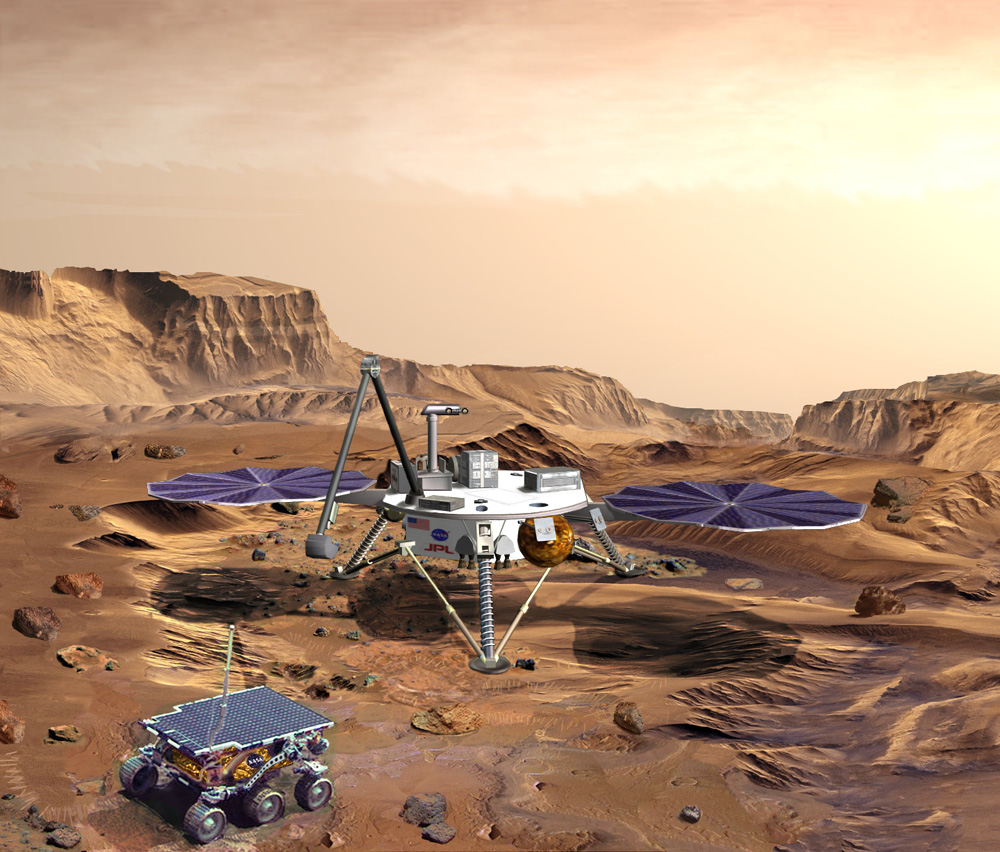
- Artworks of the orbiter (left) and surface elements (right) that would have been used in the mission

Spacecraft properties
- Spacecraft: Mars Odyssey; Unnamed lander; Marie Curie
- Manufacturer: JPL; Lockheed Martin

The Mars Surveyor 2001 project was a multi-part Mars exploration mission intended as a follow-up to Mars Surveyor '98. After the two probes of the 1998 project, Mars Climate Orbiter and Mars Polar Lander, were both lost, NASA's "better, faster, cheaper" exploration philosophy was re-evaluated, with a particular eye on the two 2001 project probes. As a result, the mission, along with the launch of its lander and rover, were canceled in May 2000, but the decision was made to continue development with its orbiter counterpart. The orbiter launched as 2001 Mars Odyssey in April 2001, in a mission independent of the Mars Surveyor project, and reached Mars in October 2001. After being placed in a cleanroom in 2001 and stored since, the nearly-completed lander component was eventually reused to fly the Phoenix mission, which launched in August 2007 and landed successfully on Mars in May 2008.

== Spacecraft ==
=== Lander ===
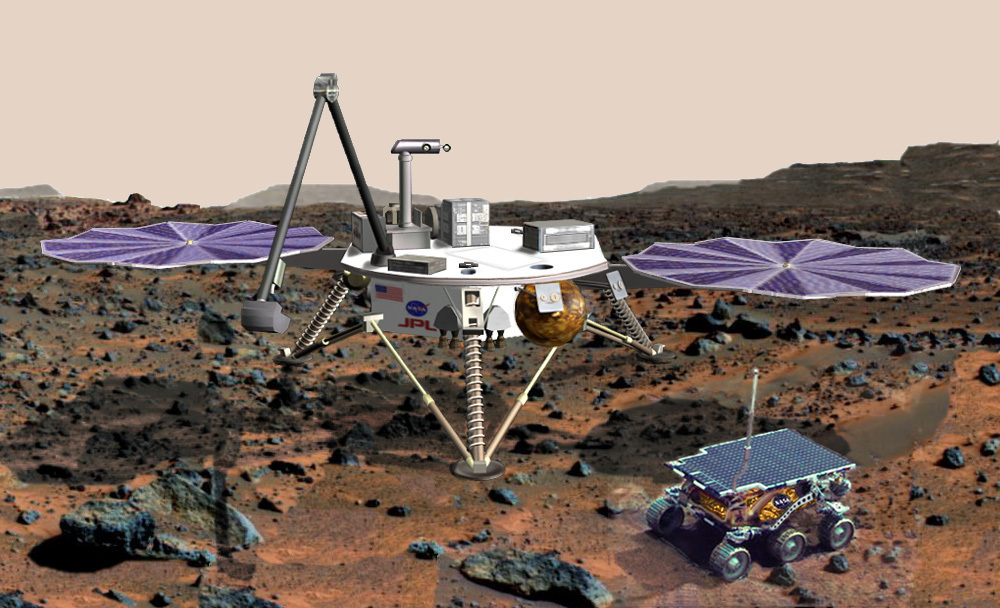
Artwork of the Mars Surveyor 2001 lander and the rover Marie Curie. The lander's design was based on the Mars Surveyor 98 lander, Mars Polar Lander, and the rover's design was based on Sojourner

The 2001 Surveyor lander spacecraft was built under contract to NASA by the Lockheed Martin corporation. Except for the solar arrays, the basic lander design is identical to that of the Mars Polar Lander, which had been intended to be the first of a series of low-cost "Mars Surveyor" landers sent to Mars. The 2001 Surveyor lander was also intended to carry to Mars a test payload, MIP (Mars ISPP Precursor), that was to demonstrate manufacture of oxygen from the atmosphere of Mars, as well as test solar cell technologies and methods of mitigating the effect of Martian dust on the power systems. MIP's overall external envelope is approximately 40 x 24 x 25 cm (15.7 x 9.4 x 9.8 inches), and its mass is 8.5 kg (18.7 lb). Most of the top surface was covered by various types of solar cells. MIP included five experiments :

- Mars Atmospheric Acquisition and Compression (MAAC): to selectively absorb and compress carbon dioxide from the Martian atmosphere; It might absorb ~ 4g CO_{2} over 1 to 3 nights, then release it on being heated.
- Oxygen Generator Subsystem (OGS): to produce propellant-grade, pure oxygen; a zirconia solid-oxide oxygen generator produces oxygen by electrolyzing CO_{2} at elevated temperatures (750 °C).
- Mars Array Technology Experiment (MATE): to measure the spectrum at the Mars surface and to test several advanced photovoltaic solar cells;
- Dust Accumulation and Repulsion Test (DART): to investigate the properties of dust and to test techniques (e.g. electrostatic repulsion) to mitigate the settling of dust on to solar arrays;
- Mars Thermal Environment & Radiator Characterization (MTERC): to measure the night sky temperature and to demonstrate the performance of high and low emissivity radiators

After the failure of the Mars Surveyor 98 mission, the launch of the Mars Surveyor 2001 lander was cancelled in May 2000, and the near-completed spacecraft was placed in an environmentally controlled cleanroom from 2001 by Lockheed Martin. The spacecraft was offered as government furnished property to investigators proposing missions to the Mars Scout Program, and the spacecraft was used as the lander on the Phoenix mission; it is currently on Mars in the north polar region. In addition to using the 2001 Surveyor Lander, three of the experiments flown on the Phoenix mission are instruments that were originally built for the Mars Surveyor 2001 Lander:

- the Microscopy, Electrochemistry, and Conductivity Analyzer (MECA);
- the never-used Mars Descent Imager (MARDI) camera;
- the Robotic Arm, which was modified for the Phoenix mission.

=== Rover ===
Prior to mission cancellation, cost overruns and technical problems caused the Lander design to be rescoped, and the planned large Athena rover was replaced by a small rover, named Marie Curie, that was a flight spare to the Sojourner which was a part of the Mars Pathfinder mission. (The Athena did later make it to Mars, however, with two such rovers making up the Mars Exploration Rover Mission of 2004. The second of these, MER-B Opportunity, landed at Mars Surveyor 2001 Lander's target site, Meridiani Planum.)

== See also ==
- List of missions to Mars
- Mars Express
- Mars Oxygen ISRU Experiment
