= Mars Surveyor '98 =

Canceled NASA spaceflight mission in the Mars Exploration Program

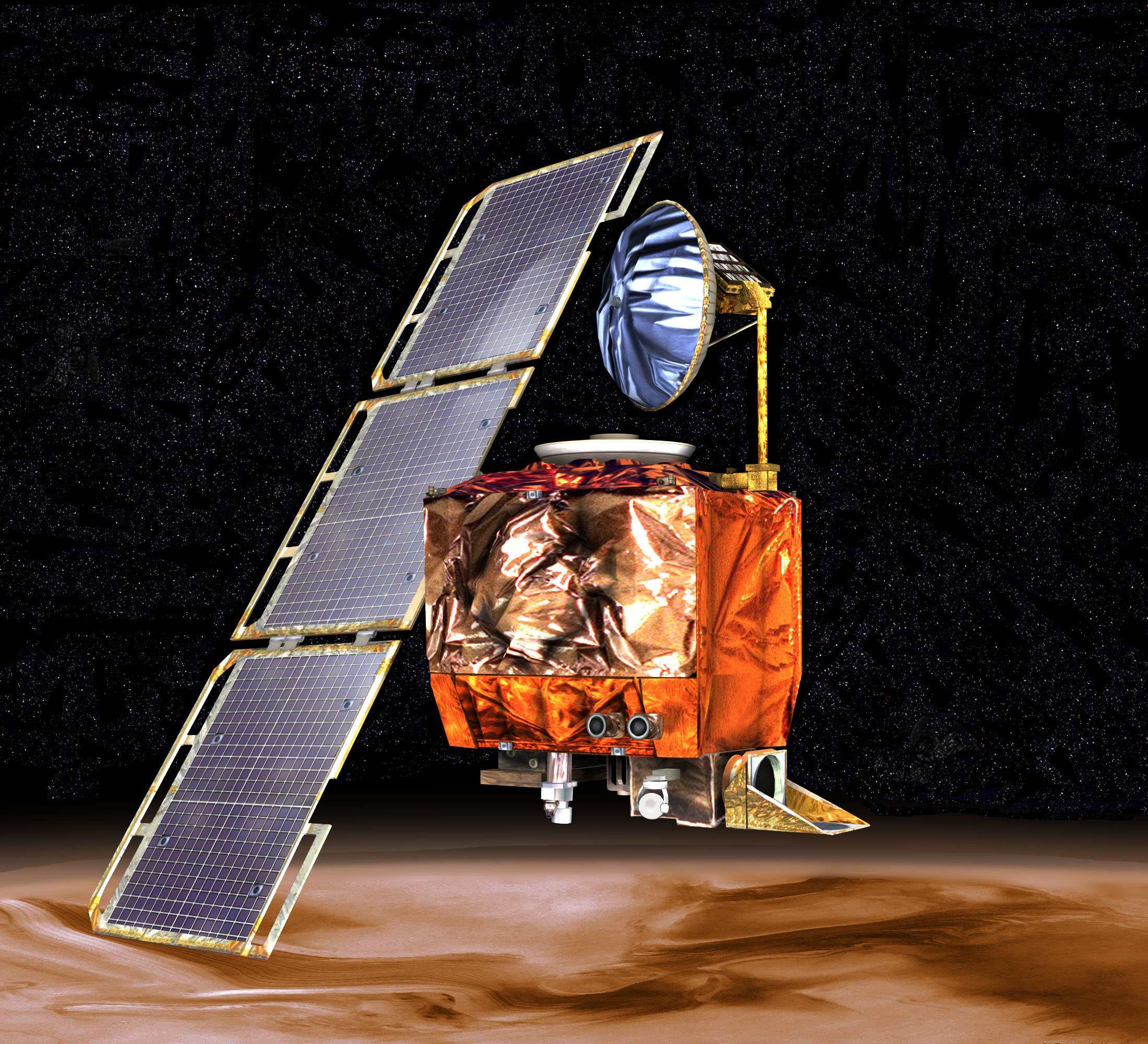
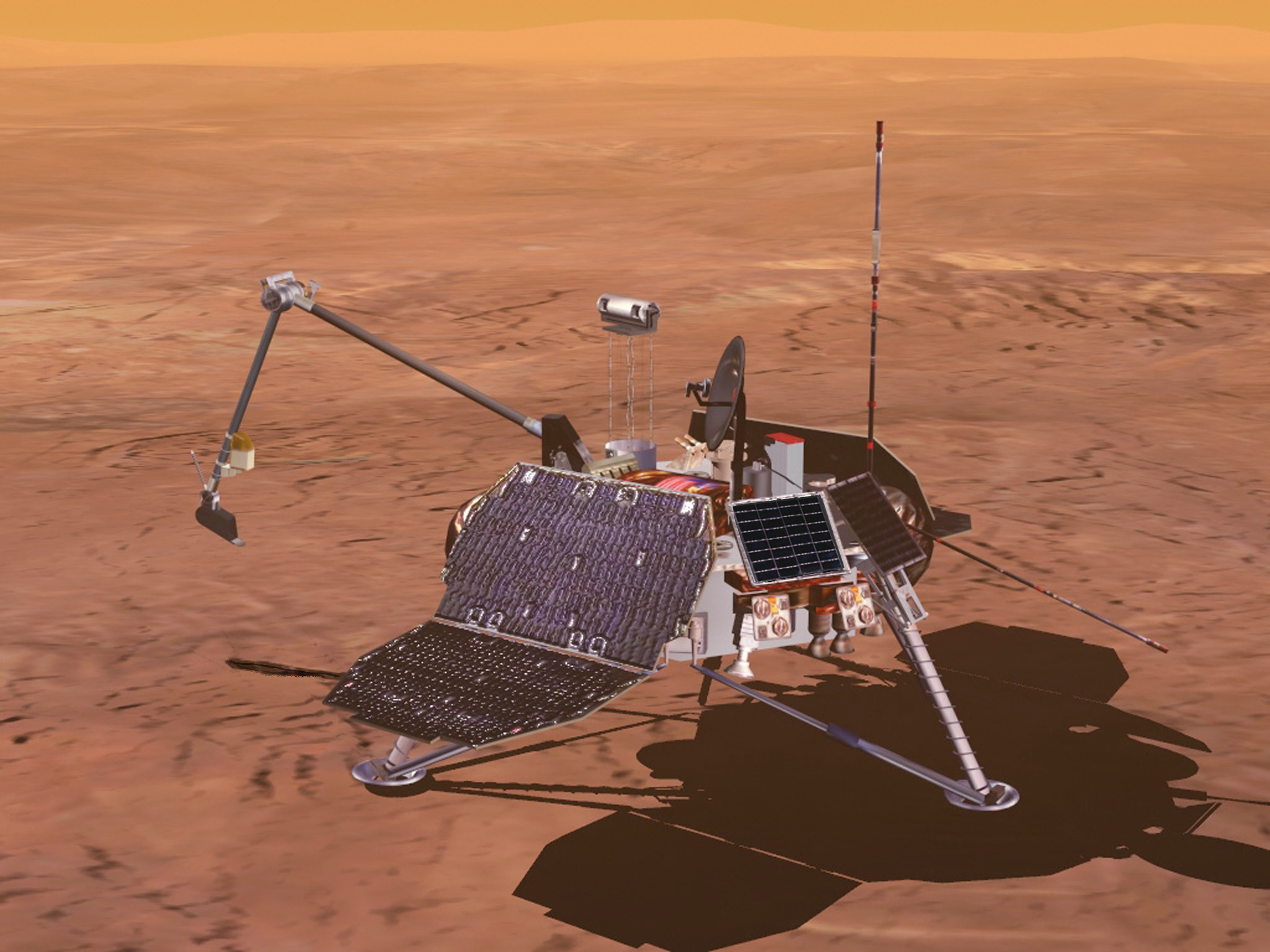
- Artworks of the mission's Mars Climate Orbiter (left) and Mars Polar Lander (right) spacecraft

Spacecraft properties
- Spacecraft: Mars Climate Orbiter; Mars Polar Lander
- Manufacturer: Lockheed Martin
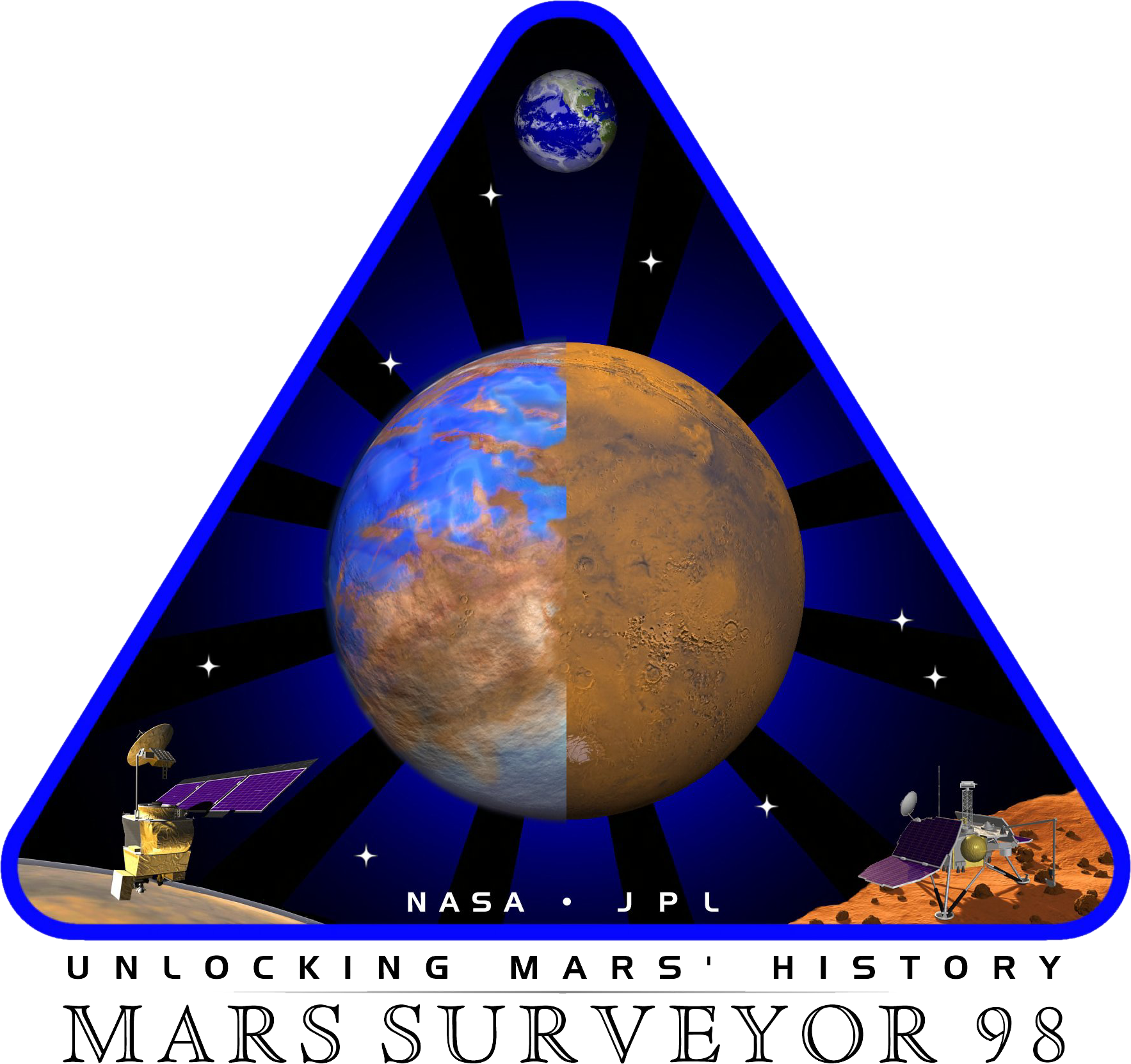
- Mission insignia Mars Exploration Program

Mars Surveyor '98 was a mission in NASA's Mars Exploration Program that launched the Mars Climate Orbiter and the Mars Polar Lander to the planet Mars. The mission was to study the Martian weather, climate, water, and carbon dioxide (CO_{2}) budget, to understand the reservoirs, behavior, and atmospheric role of volatiles and to search for evidence of long-term and episodic climate changes. The Mars Polar Lander also carried two surface-penetrator probes for the New Millennium Program's Deep Space 2 mission. Both spacecraft were launched in 1998 and both were lost.

== Spacecraft ==
=== Orbiter ===
The orbiter was lost due to a miscalculation in trajectory caused by an unintended and undetected mismatch between metric and imperial units of measurement. The use of metric units as well as the data formats to employ were specified in a navigation software interface specification (SIS) published by JPL in 1996. Despite this, the flight operations team at Lockheed Martin provided impulse data in English units of pound-force seconds rather than newton seconds. These values were incorrect by a factor of 4.45 (1 lbf = 4.45 N). This caused erroneous course corrections that caused the orbiter to descend too low in Mars's atmosphere. The vehicle either burned up or bounced off into space.

=== Lander ===
Investigators concluded that the most likely cause of the lander's failure was a spurious sensor signal associated with the craft's legs falsely indicating the craft had touched down when in fact it was some 40 meters above the surface. When the landing legs unfolded they made a bouncing motion that accidentally set off the landing sensors, causing the descent engines to shut down prematurely and the lander to fall. Another possible reason for failure was inadequate preheating of catalysis beds for the pulsing rocket thrusters. Hydrazine fuel decomposes on the beds to make hot gases that are forced out of the rocket nozzles, generating thrust; in crash review tests cold catalysis beds caused misfiring and instability.

== Mission ==
The Mars Surveyor 1998 program spacecraft development cost US$193.1 million. Launch costs for the Mars Surveyor '98 Program was estimated at US$91.7 million and mission operations at US$42.8 million. The Mars Climate Orbiter was part of NASA's 10-year Mars Surveyor Program, with launches every 26 months when the Earth and Mars are favorably positioned.

== See also ==
- List of missions to Mars
- Nozomi (spacecraft)
