= Deep Space 2 =

Failed NASA impactor mission to Mars (1999)

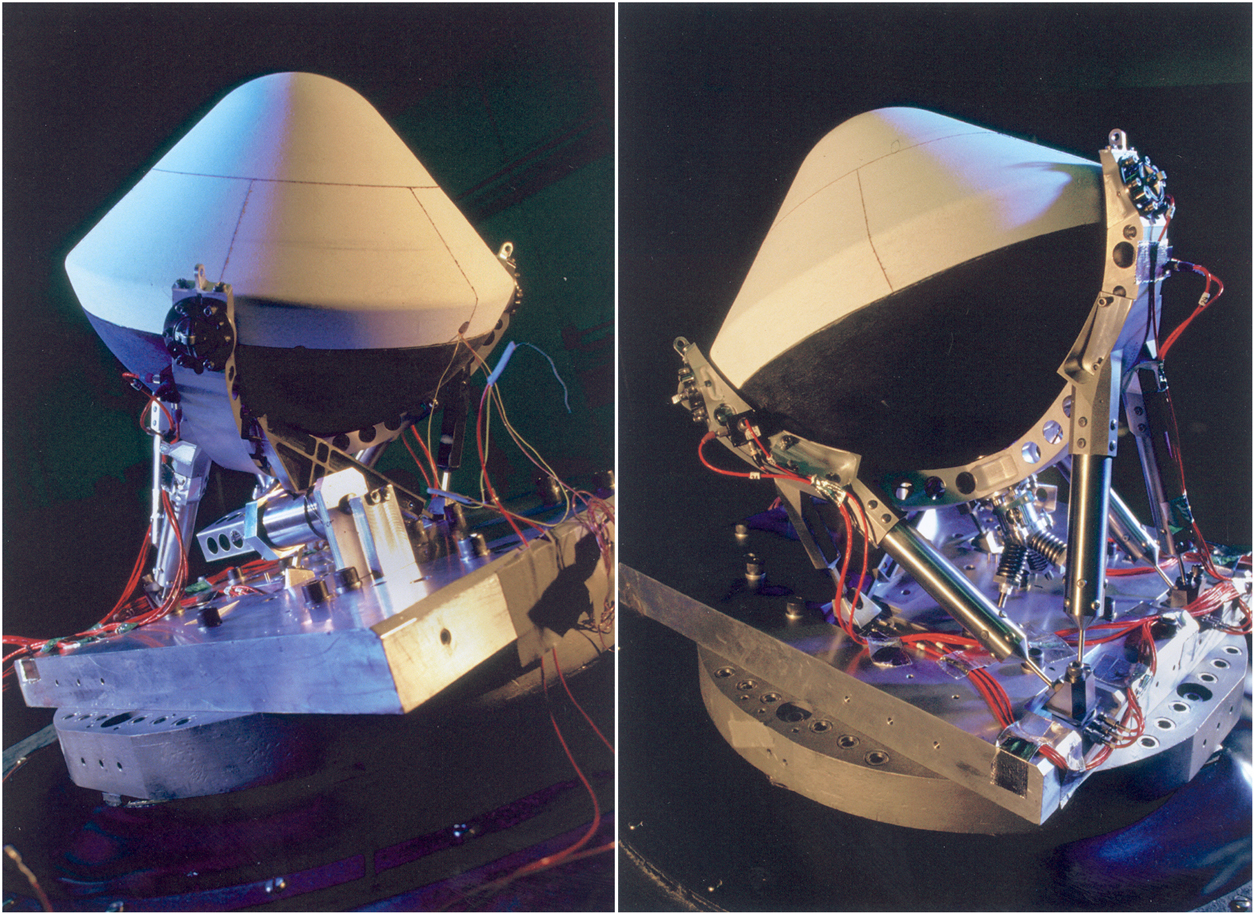
- A Deep Space 2 probe with heatshield and mounting attached to the Mars Polar Lander
- Mission type: Mars impactor
- Operator: NASA / JPL
- Website: jpl.nasa.gov
- Mission duration: 334 days Mission failure

Spacecraft properties
- Manufacturer: Jet Propulsion Laboratory
- Launch mass: 2.4 kg (5.3 lb) each
- Power: 300mW Li-SOCl_{2} batteries

Start of mission
- Launch date: 20:21:10, January 3, 1999 (UTC)
- Rocket: Delta II 7425-9.5; D-265
- Launch site: Cape Canaveral SLC-17
- Contractor: Boeing
- Deployed from: Mars Polar Lander (precluded)

End of mission
- Disposal: Failure in transit
- Last contact: 20:00, December 3, 1999 (UTC)

Mars impactor
- Spacecraft component: Amundsen and Scott
- Impact date: ~20:15 UTC ERT, December 3, 1999
- Impact site: 73°S 210°W (projected)
Instruments
- Impact accelerometer
- Water detection apparatus
- Soil conductivity probe
- Descent accelerometer
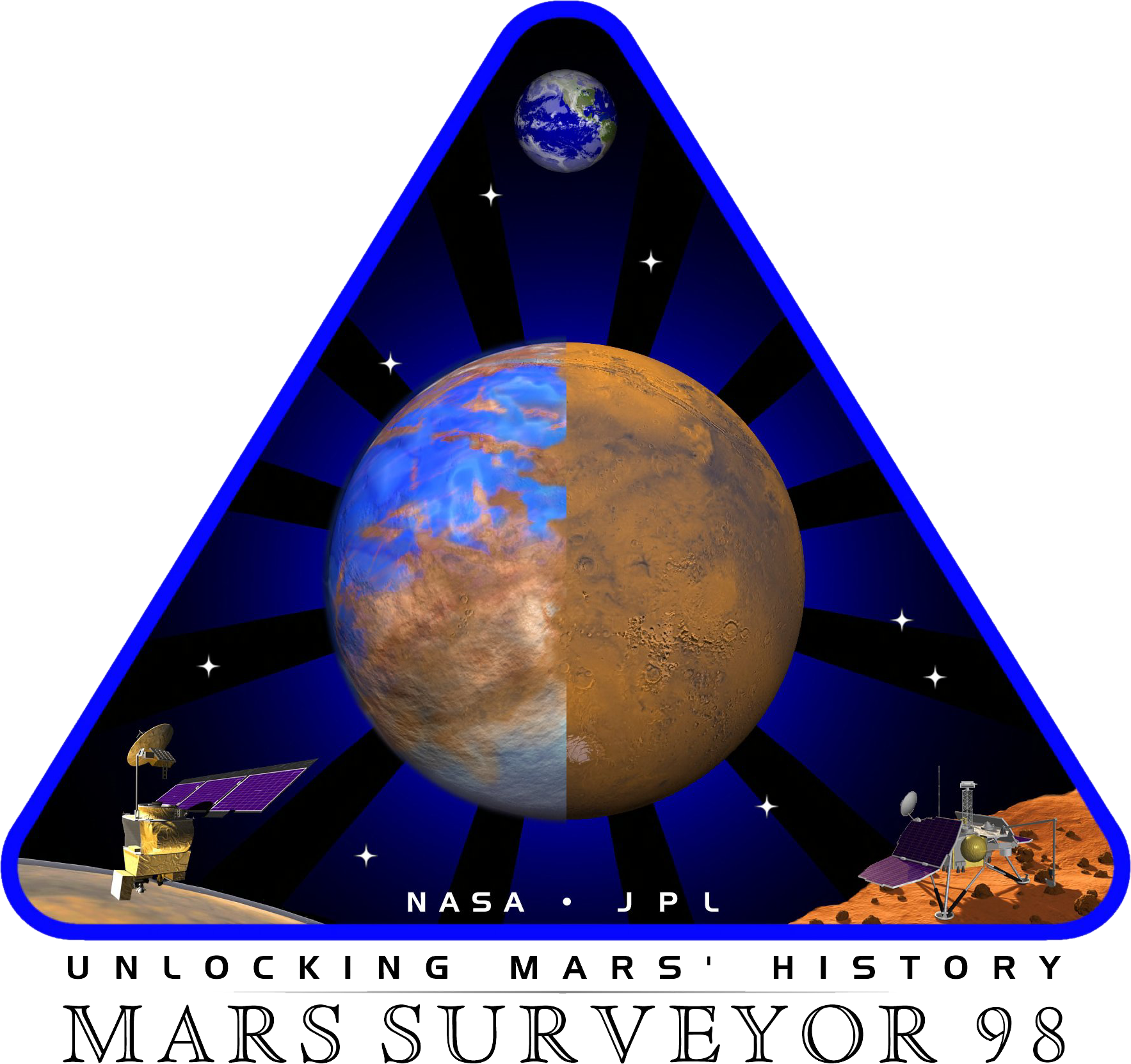
- Mars Surveyor 98 mission logo New Millennium program Mars Surveyor '98

Deep Space 2 was a NASA space probe, part of the New Millennium Program. It included two highly advanced miniature space probes that were sent to Mars aboard the Mars Polar Lander in January 1999. The probes were named "Scott" and "Amundsen", in honor of Robert Falcon Scott and Roald Amundsen, the first explorers to reach the Earth's South Pole. Intended to be the first spacecraft to penetrate below the surface of another planet, after entering the Mars atmosphere DS2 was to detach from the Mars Polar Lander mother ship and plummet to the surface using only an aeroshell impactor, with no parachute. The mission was declared a failure on March 13, 2000, after all attempts to reestablish communications following the descent went unanswered.

The Deep Space 2 development costs were US$28 million.

== Overview ==
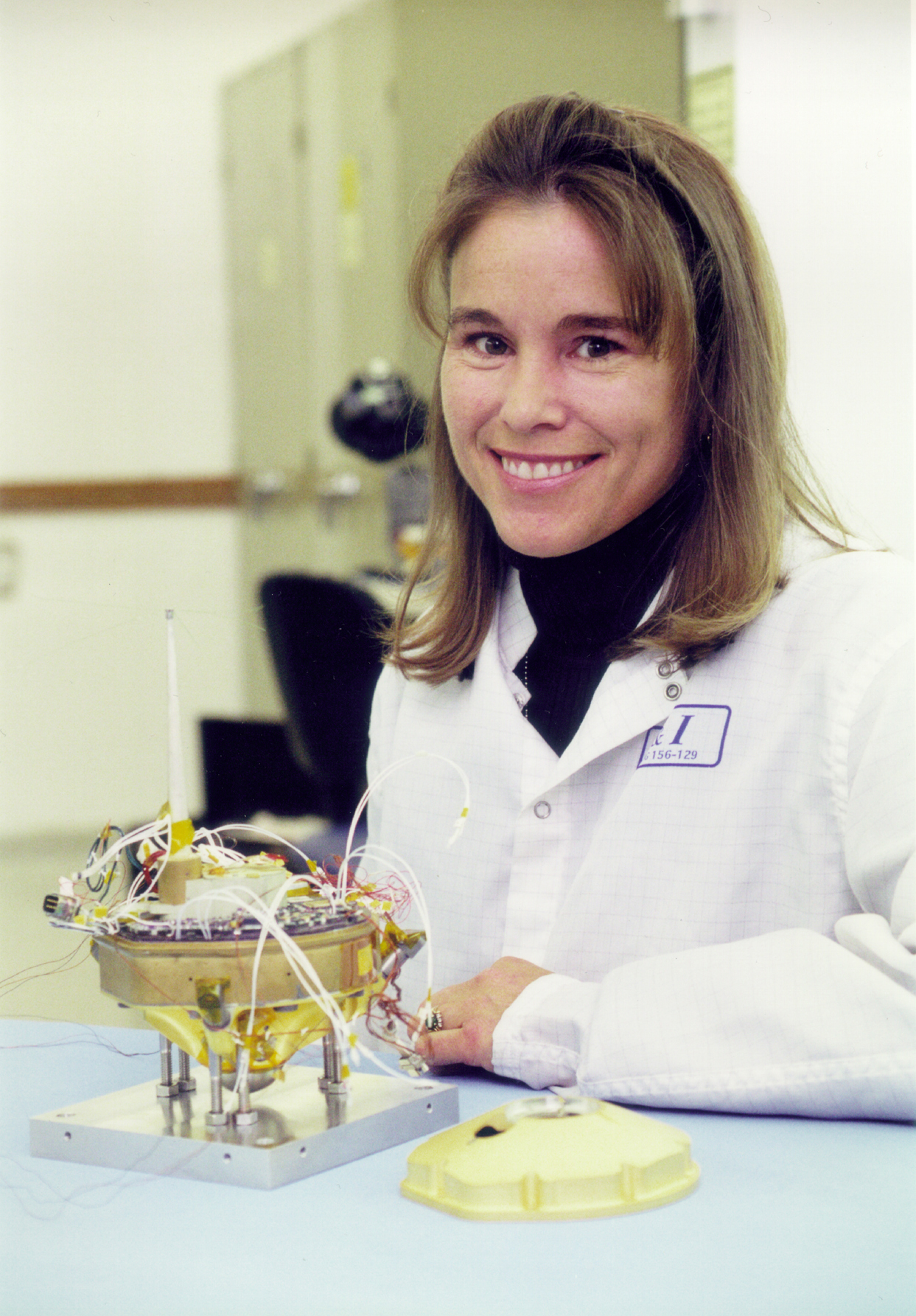
Deep Space 2 project manager Sarah Gavit with the engineering hardware of the probe

Deep Space 2, also known as "Mars Microprobe," was the second spacecraft developed under the NASA New Millennium Program to flight-test advanced technologies concepts for space missions. The purpose of the program was to do high-risk technology demonstration, with a motto "Taking risks to reduce future danger." The project was led and operated by the Jet Propulsion Laboratory in Pasadena, with contributions from The University of Arizona, New Mexico State, Northern Arizona University, the Air Force Research Laboratory, and others.

The Deep Space 2 mission was intended to do an engineering validation of the concept of a penetrator probe, impacting the planet at high velocity, instead of slowing down for a soft landing as done by the probes conventionally used for planetary exploration. The penetrator concept is potentially a lower-cost approach, and has a proposed advantage of giving access to the subsurface of the planet being studied (in this case, Mars.)

Though the primary objective was to validate the technology, the probes also had goals for science analysis at Mars. These goals were “1) to derive the atmospheric density, pressure, and temperature throughout the entire atmospheric column, 2) to characterize the hardness of the soil and possibly the presence of layers at a scale of tens of centimeters, 3) to determine if ice is present in the subsurface soil, and, 4) to estimate the thermal conductivity of the soil at depth.” The eventual goal for such probes was to deploy networks “around a planet using no more resources than a single landing under conventional assumptions.”

The probes were launched with the Mars Polar Lander on January 3, 1999, on a Delta II 7425 Launch Vehicle.

=== Spacecraft ===
Each probe weighed 2.4 kg (5.3 lb) and was encased in a protective aeroshell. They rode to Mars aboard another spacecraft, the Mars Polar Lander.

Upon arrival near the south polar region of Mars on December 3, 1999, the basketball-sized shells were released from the main spacecraft, plummeting through the atmosphere and hitting the planet's surface at over 179 m/s (590 ft/s). On impact, each shell was designed to shatter, and its grapefruit-sized probe was to punch through the soil and separate into two parts. The lower part, called the forebody, was designed to penetrate as far as 0.6 meters (2 ft 0 in) into the soil. It contained the primary science instrument on board, the Evolved Water Experiment. The upper part of the probe, or aftbody, was designed to remain on the surface in order to transmit data through its UHF antenna to the Mars Global Surveyor spacecraft in orbit around Mars. The Mars Global Surveyor would act as a relay in order to send the data collected back to Earth. The two sections of the probe were designed to remain connected via a data cable.

== Science Instruments ==
The probes were each equipped with five instruments to enable analysis of the atmosphere, surface, and subsurface.

• Descent accelerometer: The descent accelerometer was a commercially available sensor meant to measure accelerations from drag during descent. Its readings could “be used to derive a density profile of the Martian atmosphere” based on the acceleration data combined with knowledge of the probe's speed and ballistic coefficient.

• Impact accelerometer: The impact accelerometer was built with a range of ±120,000 g for the large expected acceleration on impact with Mars's surface.

• Meteorological sensor: provides atmospheric pressure and temperature data at the landing site. This sensor was located on the back of the probe so that it would stay above the surface after impact. It was sampled and recorded by the telecommunications “which enables the acquisition of meteorological data in the event that the microcontroller failed during the impact.”

• Soil Thermal Conductivity Temperature Sensors: Twin platinum resistor temperature sensors would determine rates of cooling in the forebody once submerged in the surface.

• Evolved Water Experiment: A small sample collection system in the forebody would bring Martian regolith into a heating chamber. The sample would then be heated to allow spectroscopy measurements on the resulting vapor using a miniaturized tunable diode laser. The Evolved Water Experiment was the primary instrument on board the probe.

== New Technologies: High Impact and Low Temperature Electronics ==
Custom electronics and batteries were designed for the Deep Space 2 probes to survive extremely high accelerations on impact with the surface of Mars and the cold temperatures that it would experience once in operation. Both the electronics and the custom cells were required to survive an impact on the order of 80,000 g and operational temperatures as low at -80 °C. Additionally, as much as a 30,000 g difference in acceleration was possible between the forebody and aftbody.

Batteries

Together with Yardney Technical Products, JPL designed a battery with two non-rechargeable 6-14V cells using lithium-thionyl chloride (LI-SOCl_{2}) chemistry to survive the expected conditions. The batteries were impact tested and also thermally cycled during development.

Electronics Packaging

Due to the probe's form factor and the harsh survivability conditions, JPL used novel techniques to secure the onboard electronics. The techniques included chip-on-board (COB) technology to improve packing density. It also used a 1-meter flexible umbilical cable to connect the forebody penetrator that would be displaced upon impact. Mechanical (non-functioning) models were impact tested before launch to determine if the structures would survive.

== Mission failure ==
The probes reached Mars along with the Mars Polar Lander mission, apparently without incident, but communication was never established after impact. It is not known what the cause of failure was.

A failure review board was commissioned to report on the failures of the Mars Polar Lander and Deep Space 2 probes. The review board was unable to identify a probable cause of failure, but suggested several possible causes:

- The probe radio equipment had a low chance of surviving the impact.
- The batteries may have failed on impact.
- The probes may have bounced on impact.
- The probes may have landed on their sides, resulting in bad antenna performance or radio link geometry.
- The probes may simply have hit ground that was too rocky for survival.

The board concluded that the probes and their components were not tested adequately before launch.

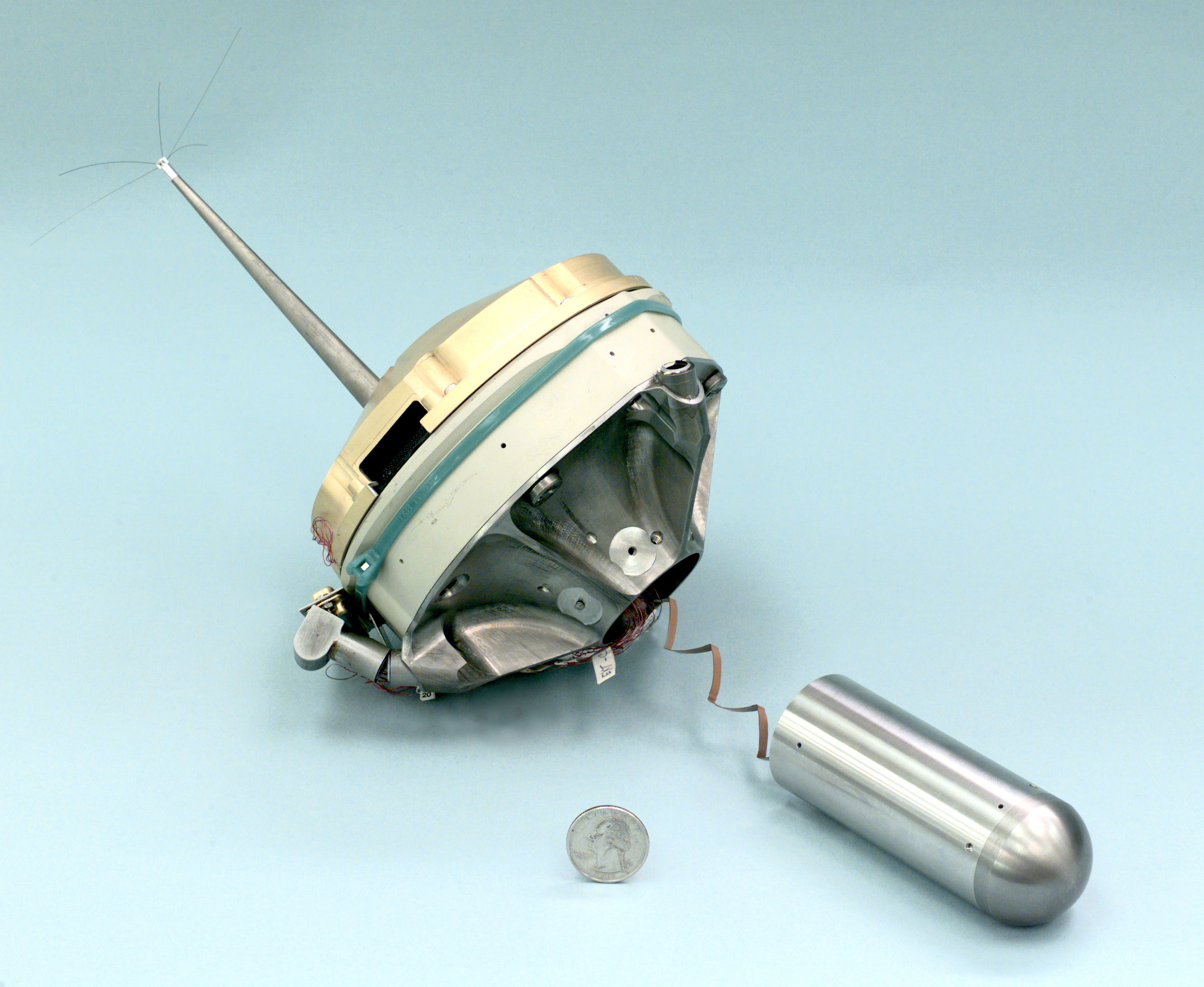
Deep Space 2 penetrator

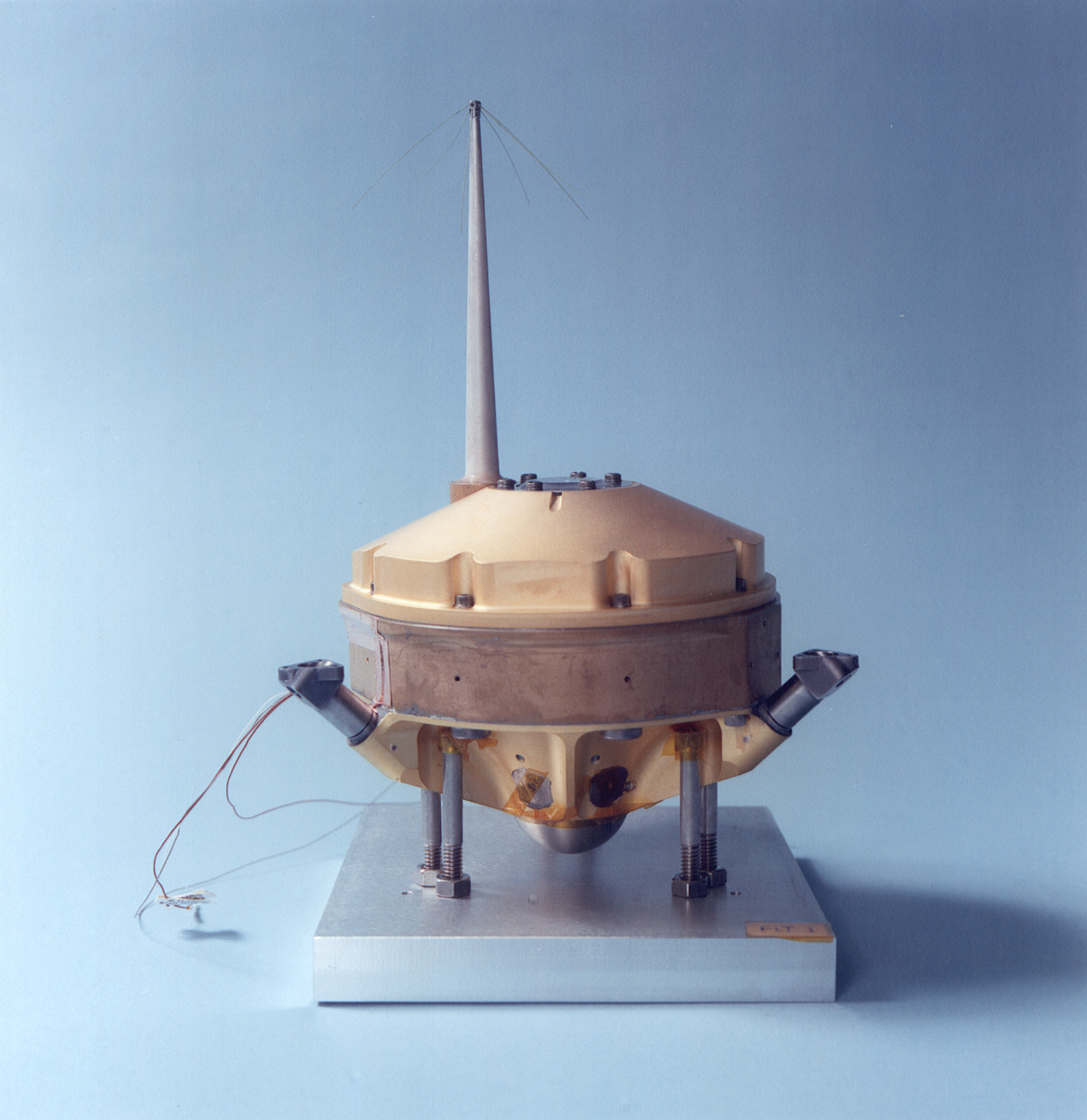
Deep Space 2 surface element

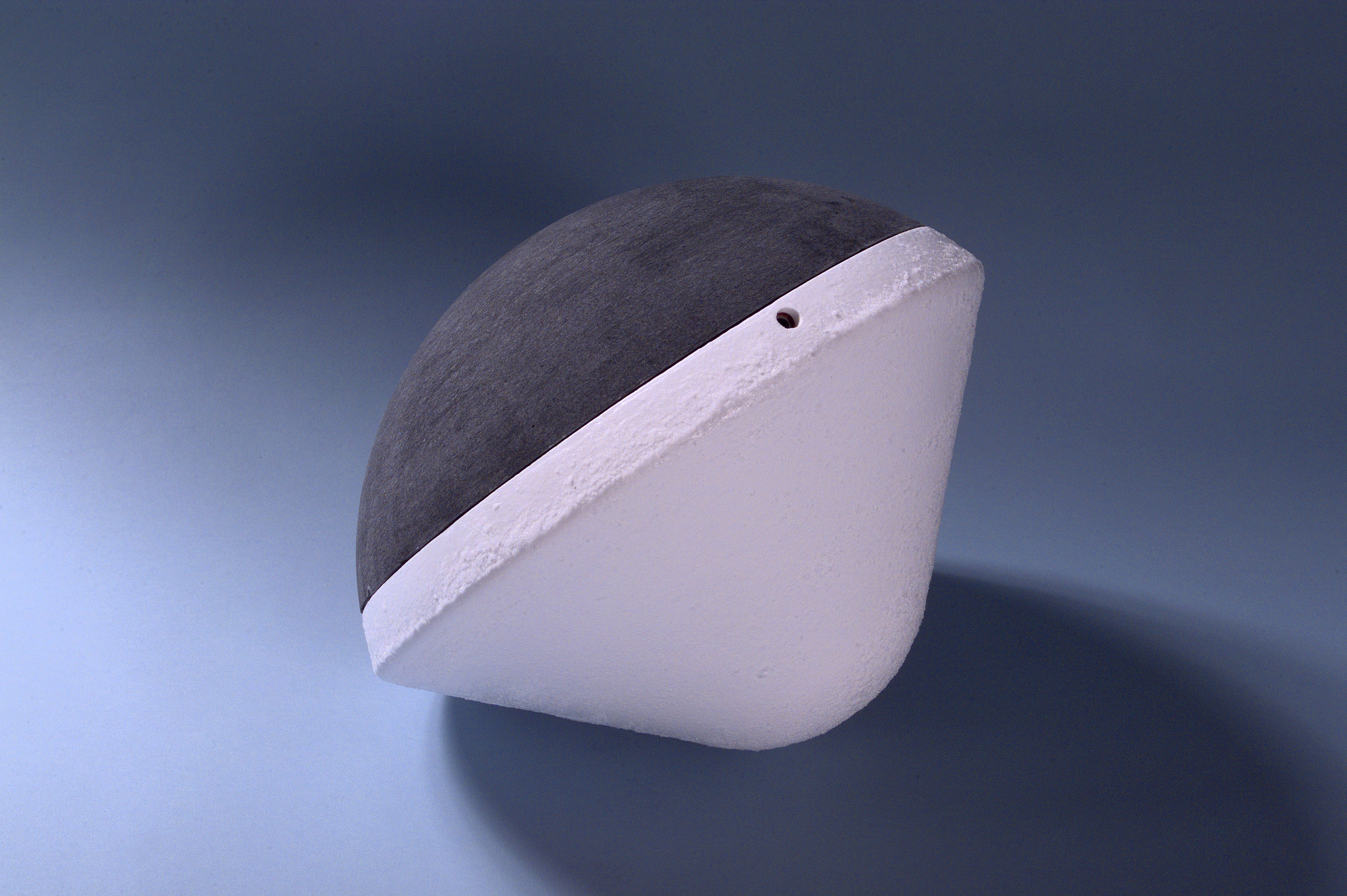
DS-2 entry aeroshell

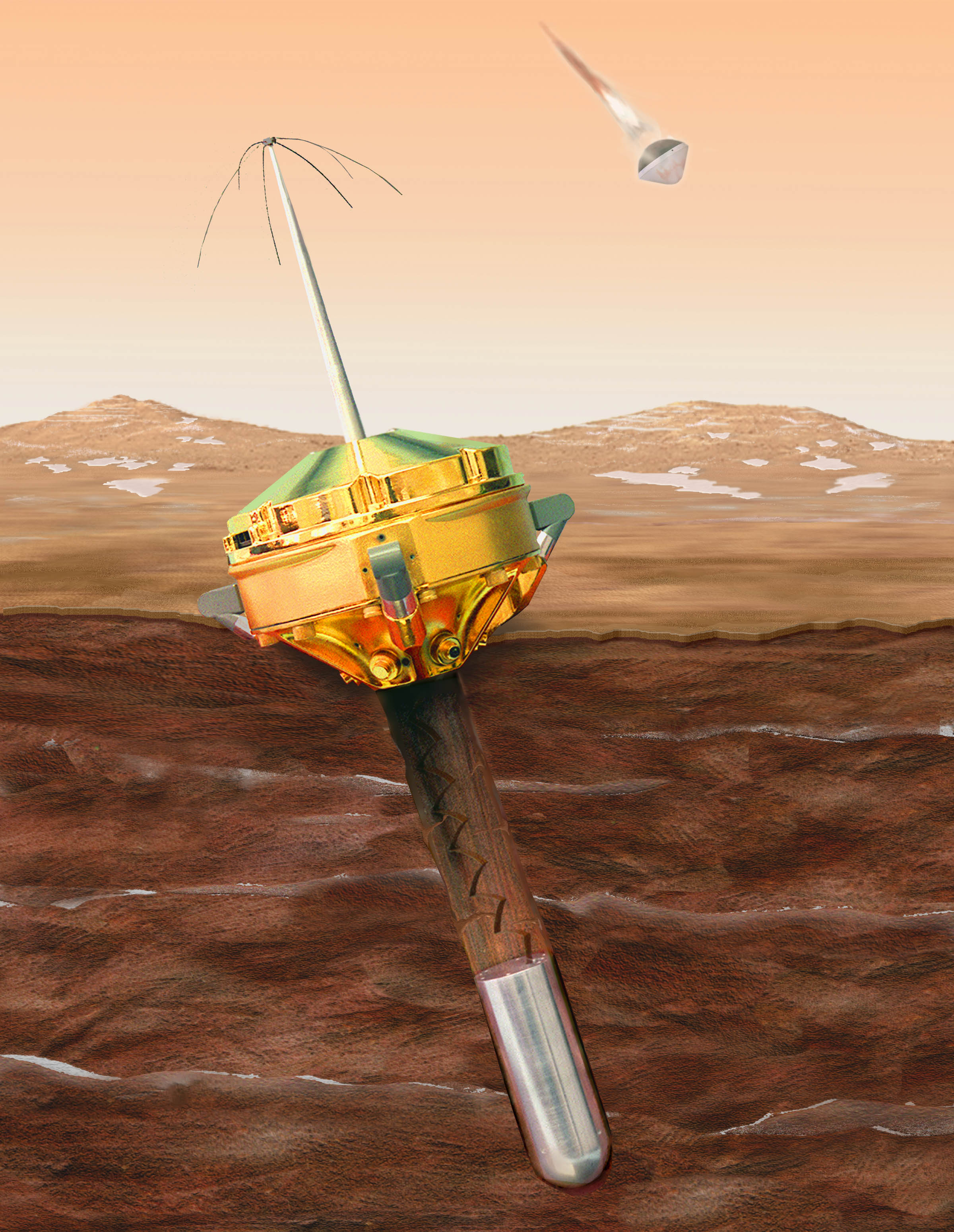
Visualization of Deep Space 2 as deployed after penetration

DS2 functional animation

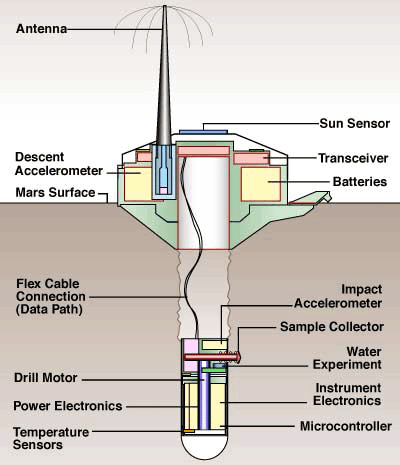
DS2 probe components

== Aftermath ==
Despite the failures of Mars Polar Lander and the two Deep Space 2 probes, Planum Australe, which served as their exploration target, would in later years be explored by European Space Agency's MARSIS radar, which examined and analyzed the site from Mars's orbit and even determined that the area had water beneath its vast area of ice. Images which were obtained from MARSIS also determined that the water discovered beneath Planum Australe was in fact saltwater.

== See also ==
- Exploration of Mars
- Deep Space 1
- InSight – successful Mars lander carrying similar burrowing probe with temperature sensor
- List of missions to Mars
- List of spacecraft powered by non-rechargeable batteries

== Bibliography ==
- JPL, Deep Space 2 Fact Sheet
- NSSDC Data Archive, Deep Space 2
- "Press Kit: 1998 Mars Missions" (.PDF) (Press release). National Aeronautics and Space Administration. December 8, 1998.
