= Evidence of water on Mars found by Mars Reconnaissance Orbiter =

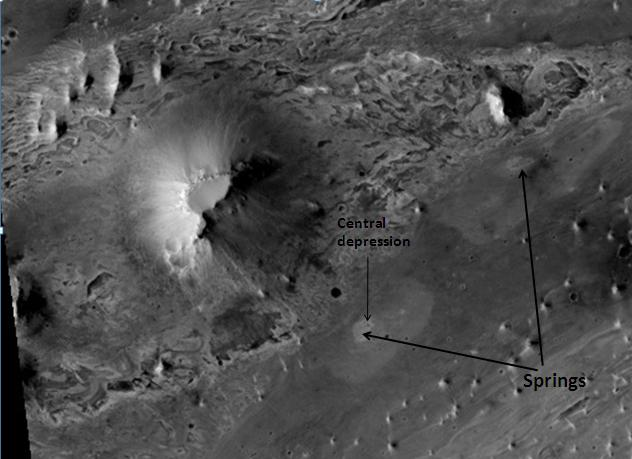
Springs in Vernal Crater, as seen by HIRISE. These springs may be good places to look for evidence of past life because hot springs can preserve evidence of life forms for a long time. Location is Oxia Palus quadrangle.

The Mars Reconnaissance Orbiter's HiRISE instrument has taken many images that strongly suggest that Mars has had a rich history of water-related processes. Many features of Mars appear to be created by large amounts of water. That Mars once possessed large amounts of water was confirmed by isotope studies in a study published in March 2015, by a team of scientists showing that the ice caps were highly enriched with deuterium, heavy hydrogen, by around seven times as much as the Earth. This means that Mars had lost a volume of water 6.5 times what is stored in today's polar caps. The water for a time would have formed an ocean in the low-lying Mare Boreum. The amount of water could have covered the planet about 140 meters, but was probably in an ocean that in places would be almost 1 mile deep.

A major discovery by HiRISE was finding evidence of hot springs. These may have contained life and may now contain well-preserved fossils of life.

== Recurring slope lineae ==
Seasonal flows on warm Martian slopes (also called recurring slope lineae, recurrent slope lineae and RSL) are thought to be salty water flows occurring during the warmest months on Mars. Indeed, there is much photographic and spectroscopic evidence that water does today flow on parts of Mars.

Some researchers have proposed that the flow is aided by the water boiling in thin Martian atmosphere. Boiling water would cause soil particles to bounce and help them to flow down slopes.

In a study published in Icarus in 2016, A team, headed by David Stillman, identified 239 locations for recurring slope lineae within Valles Marineris. About half of lineae locations on Mars are in Valles Marineris. It was found that the lengthening of the lineae depends on how the slope is orientated. Lengthening was observed in all seasons inside Valles Marineris. This long active season suggests that there must be an appreciable source of water that supplies the lineae. Calculations show that the lineae are active between minus 27 degrees C and minus 9 degrees C to display the activity observed. Water would do this if it was in a brine having of tens of wt% salt.

Although these features were initially thought to be evidence of current water flow, some studies show that little or no water may be involved. An analysis of data from the Mars Odyssey neutron spectrometer revealed that the RSL sites do not contain any more water than found at anywhere else at similar latitudes. The authors concluded that RSL are not supplied by large, near-surface briny aquifers. It is still possible with this data that water vapor from deeply buried ice, from the atmosphere, or from small deeply buried aquifers.

A study published in Nature Geoscience, suggest that very little water is involved in creating recurrent slope lineae because these streaks only occur on steep slopes—slopes that would allow dry sand and dust to move down. If water were involved, at least some of the lineae would move onto lower slopes. Small amounts of water may start the process however. A study spanning 4 Martian years concluded that a dry origin was the most likely cause of the streaks. In the study region, Tivat Crater, rockfall markings faded at the same time as recurrent slope lineae (RSL), suggesting a fading mechanism that acts across the whole crater.

Dark flows in Newton Crater extending during summer (video-gif).

Warm season flows on slope in Horowitz Crater (video-gif).
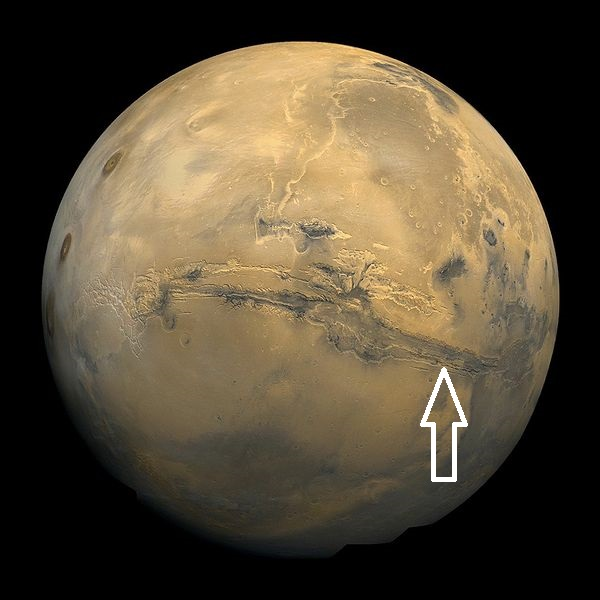
Image of disk of Mars taken by Viking. Arrow shows location of recurrent slope lineae in following HiRISE images.

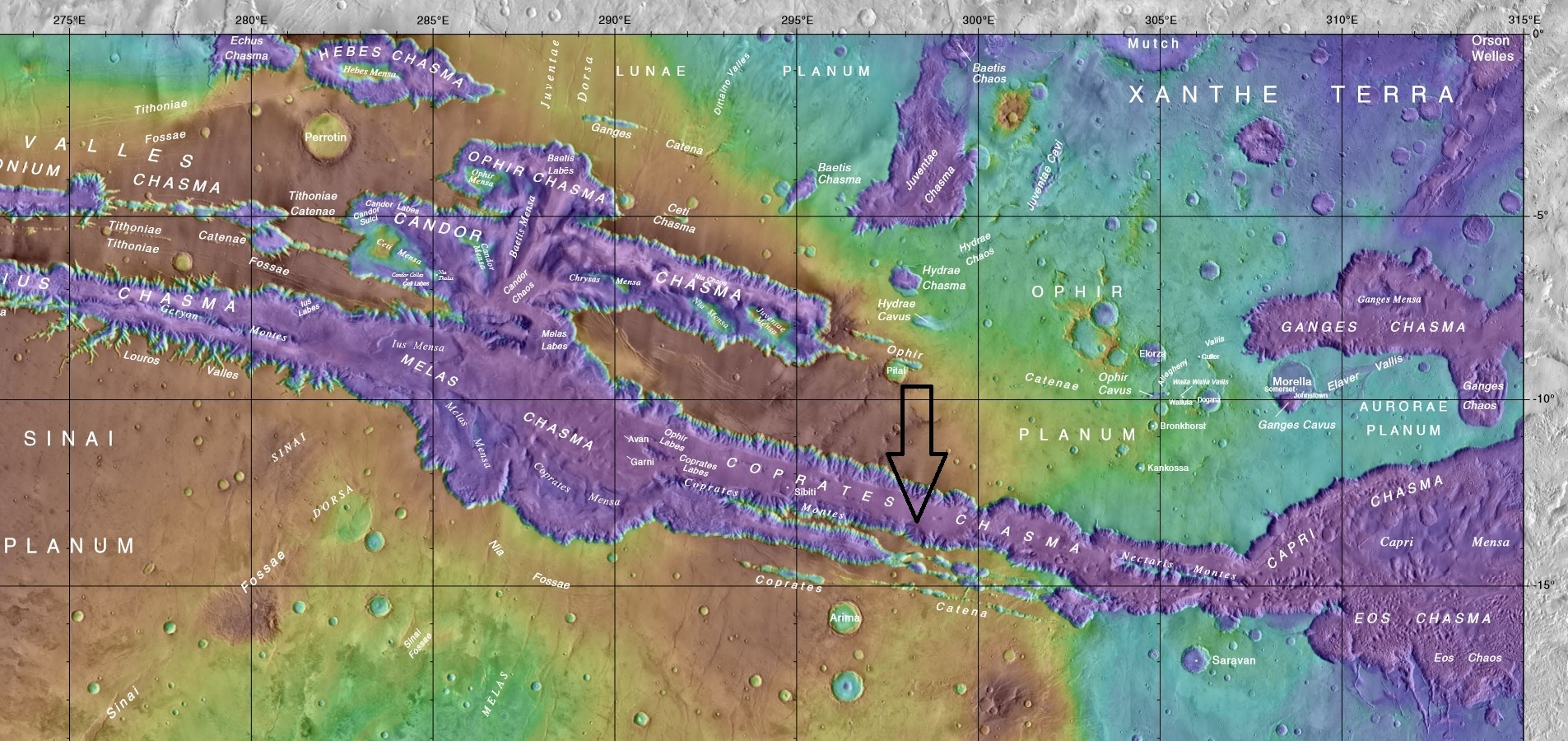
Labeled map of features near to Coprates Chasma. Arrow shows location of recurrent slope lineae in following HiRISE images.

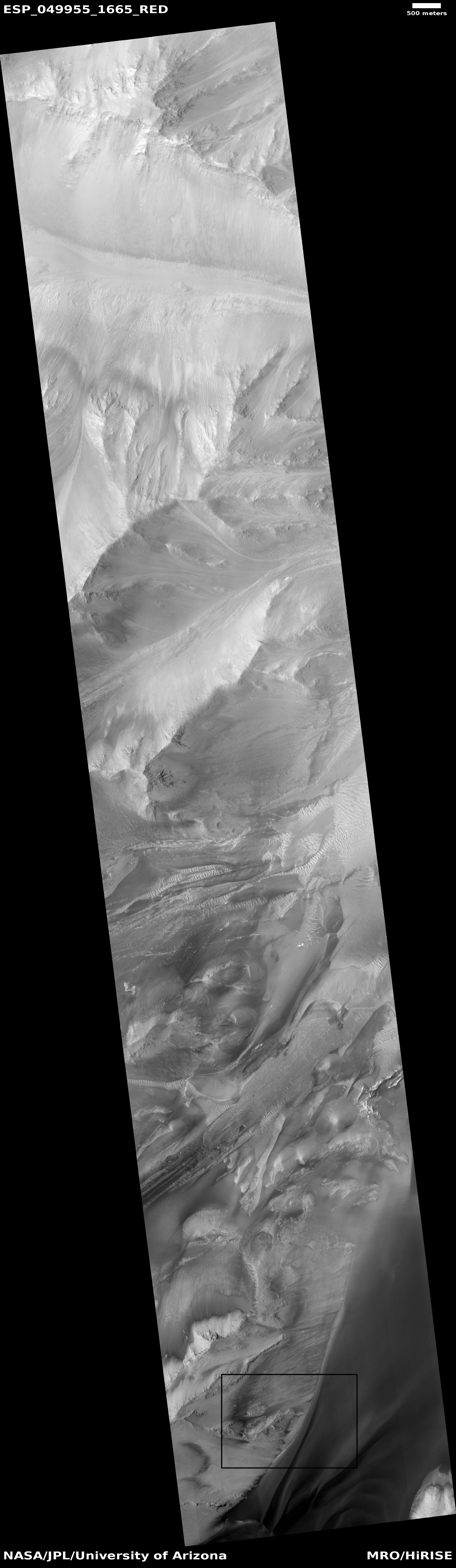
Wide view of part of Valles Marineris, as seen by HiRISE under HiWish program Box shows location of recurrent slope lineae that are enlarged in next image.

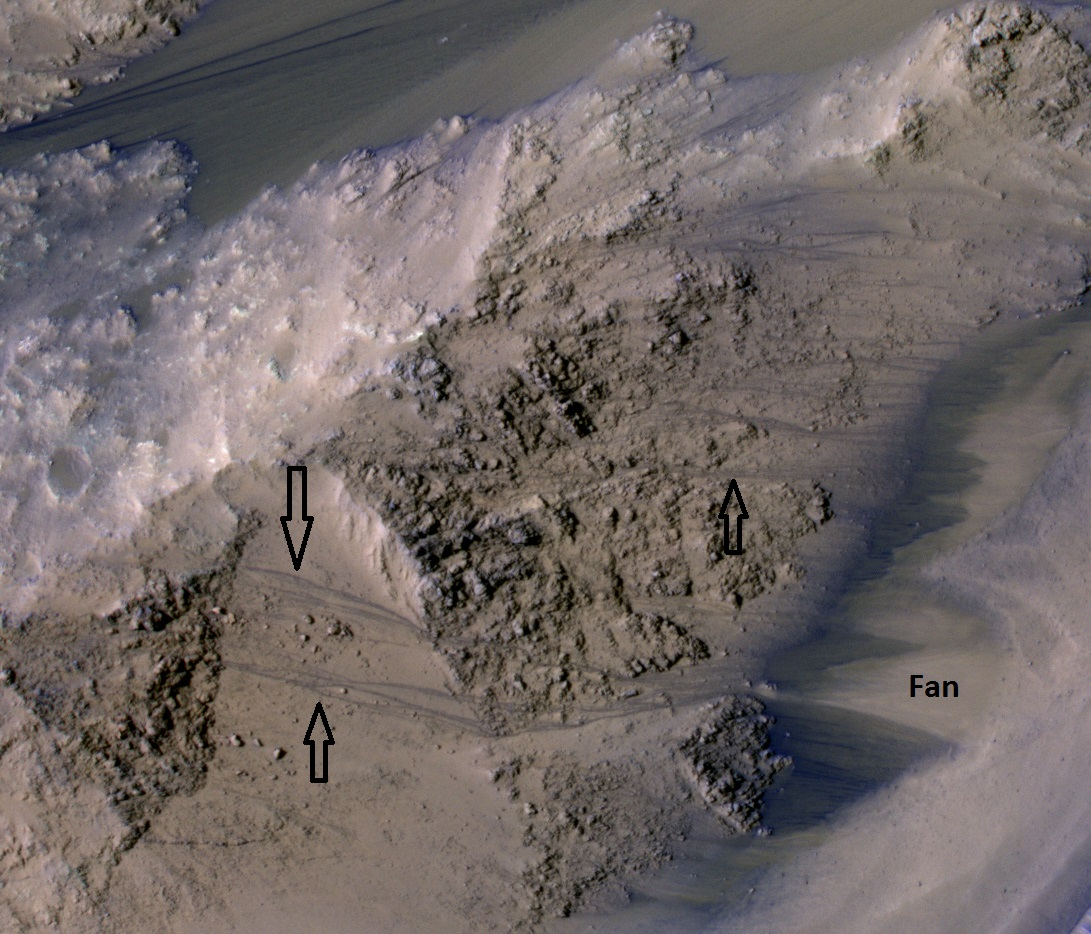
Close, color view of recurrent slope lineae, as seen by HiRISE under HiWish program Arrows point to some of the recurrent slope lineae. Fan may have been built up by past recurrent slope lineae.

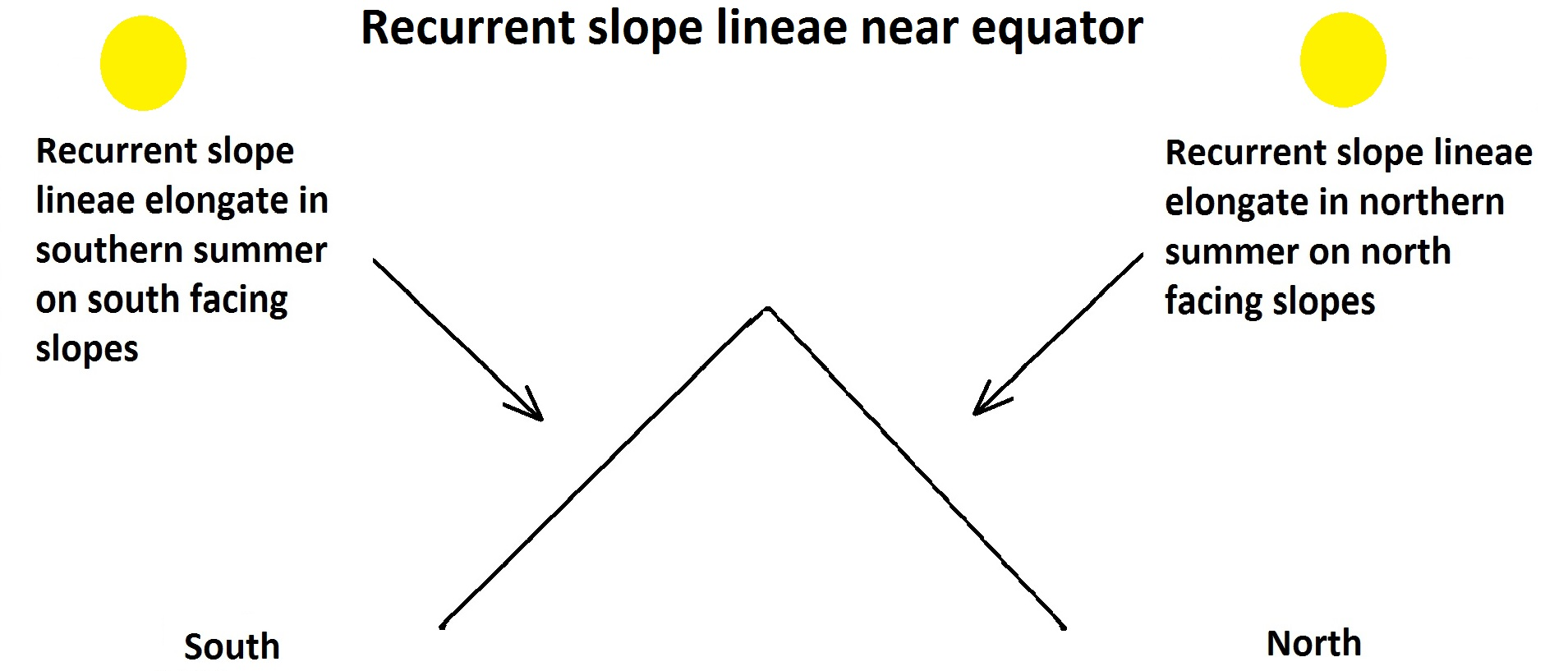
Recurrent slope lineae elongate when the slopes are at their warmest. Near the equator, RSL elongate on northern slopes in the northern summer and on the southern slopes in the southern summer.

== Eridania Lake ==
Eridania Lake is a theorized ancient lake with a surface area of roughly 1.1 million square kilometers. Its maximum depth is 2,400 meters and its volume is 562,000^{km}. It was larger than the largest landlocked sea on Earth, the Caspian Sea and contained more water than all the other martian lakes together. The Eridania sea held more than 9 times as much water as all of America's Great Lakes. The upper surface of the lake was assumed to be at the elevation of valley networks that surround the lake; they all end at the same elevation, suggesting that they emptied into a lake.

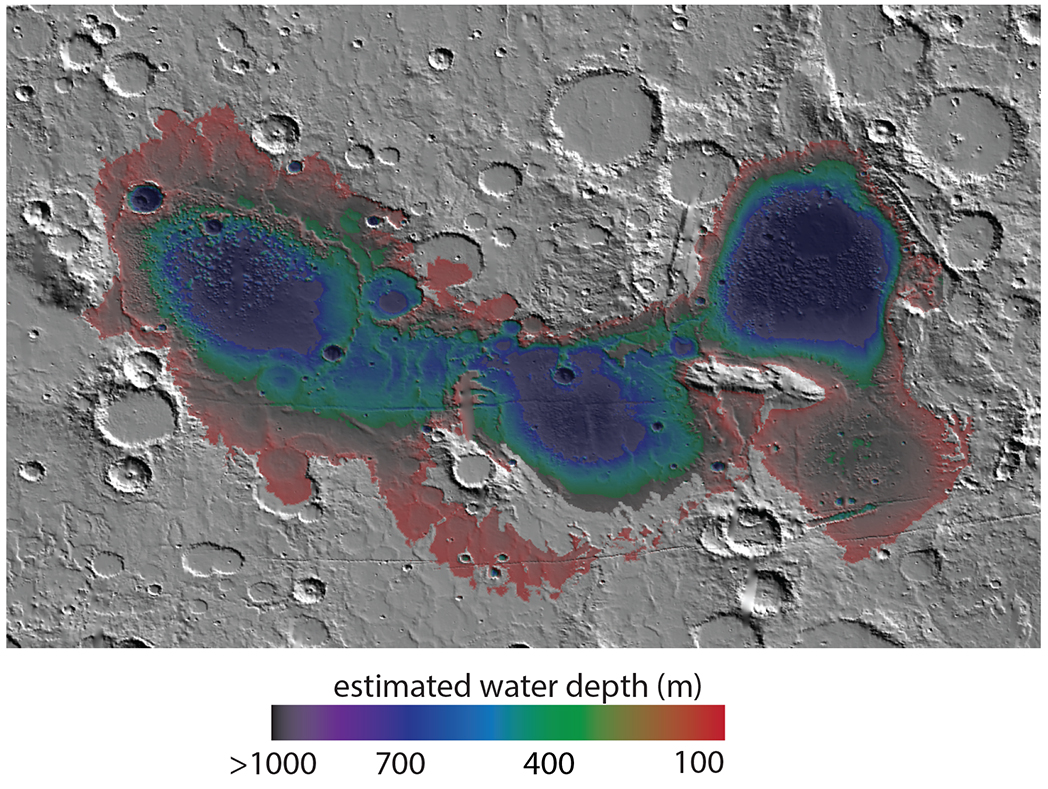
Map showing estimated water depth in different parts of Eridania Sea. This map is about 530 miles across.

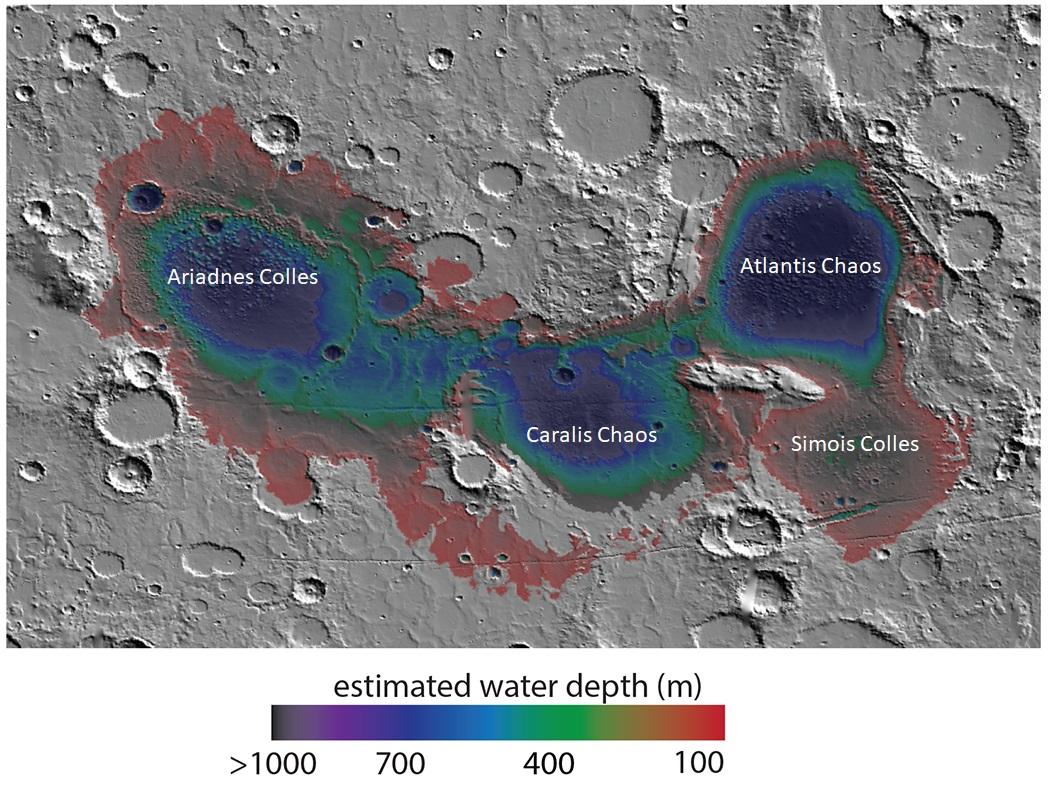
Features around Eridania Sea labeled

Research with CRISM found thick deposits, greater than 400 meters thick, that contained the minerals saponite, talc-saponite, Fe-rich mica (for example, glauconite-nontronite), Fe- and Mg-serpentine, Mg-Fe-Ca-carbonate and probable Fe-sulphide. The Fe-sulphide probably formed in deep water from water heated by volcanoes. Such a process, classified as hydrothermal may have been a place where life began. Saponite, talc, talc-saponite, nontronite, glauconite, and serpentine are all common on the seafloors on Earth. The earliest evidence of life on Earth appear in seafloor deposits that are similar to those found in the Eridania basin. So, samples of material from the Eridania may give us insight into the environment of the early Earth. Chloride deposits were found where a shoreline existed. They were deposited as water evaporated from the sea. These chloride deposits are thought to be thin (less than 30 meters), because some craters do not display the chemical in their ejecta. A crater's ejecta contains material from under the surface, therefore if the chloride deposits were very deep they would have appeared in the ejecta.

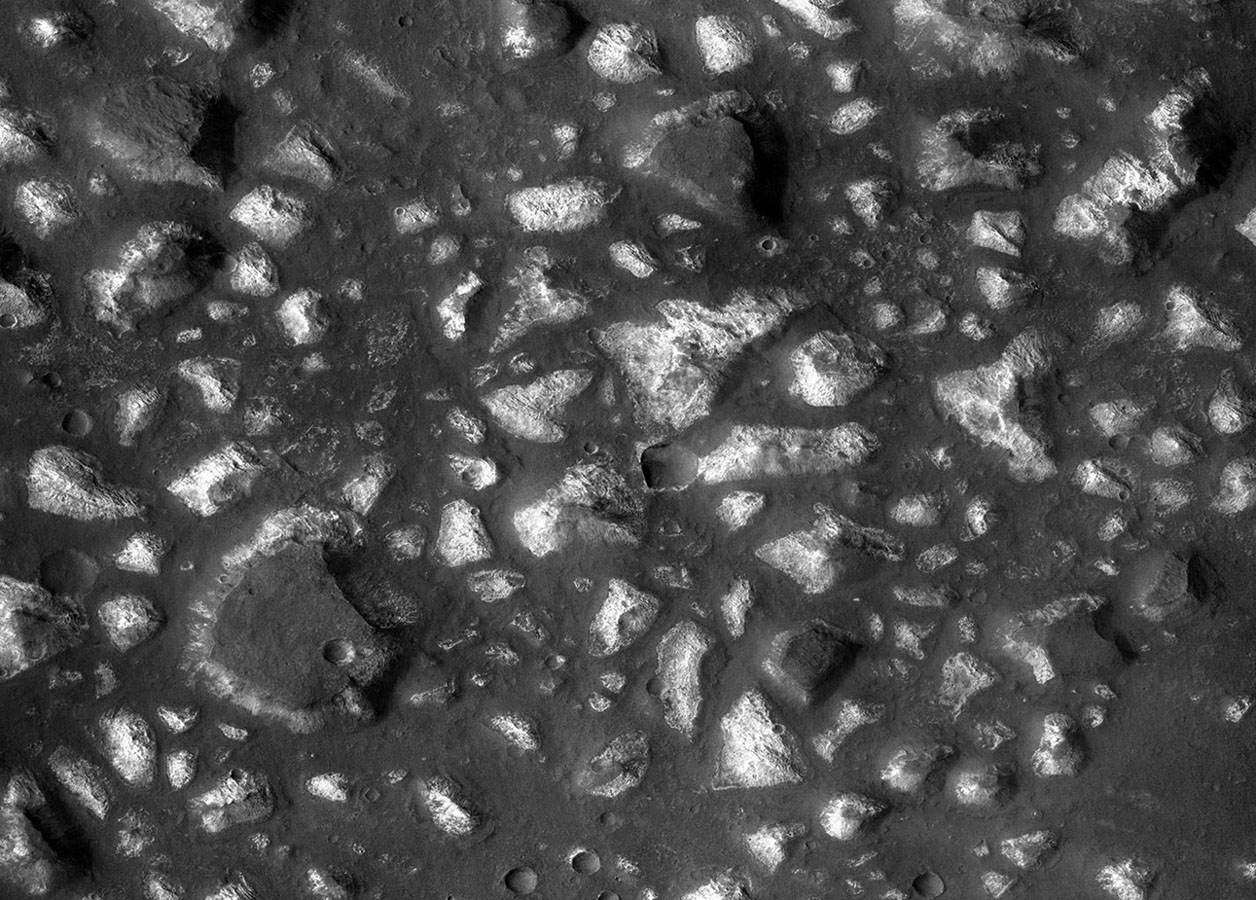
Deep-basin deposits from the floor of Eridania Sea. The mesas on the floor are there because they were protected against intense erosion by deep water/ice cover. CRISM measurements show minerals may be from seafloor hydrothermal deposits. Life may have originated in this sea.

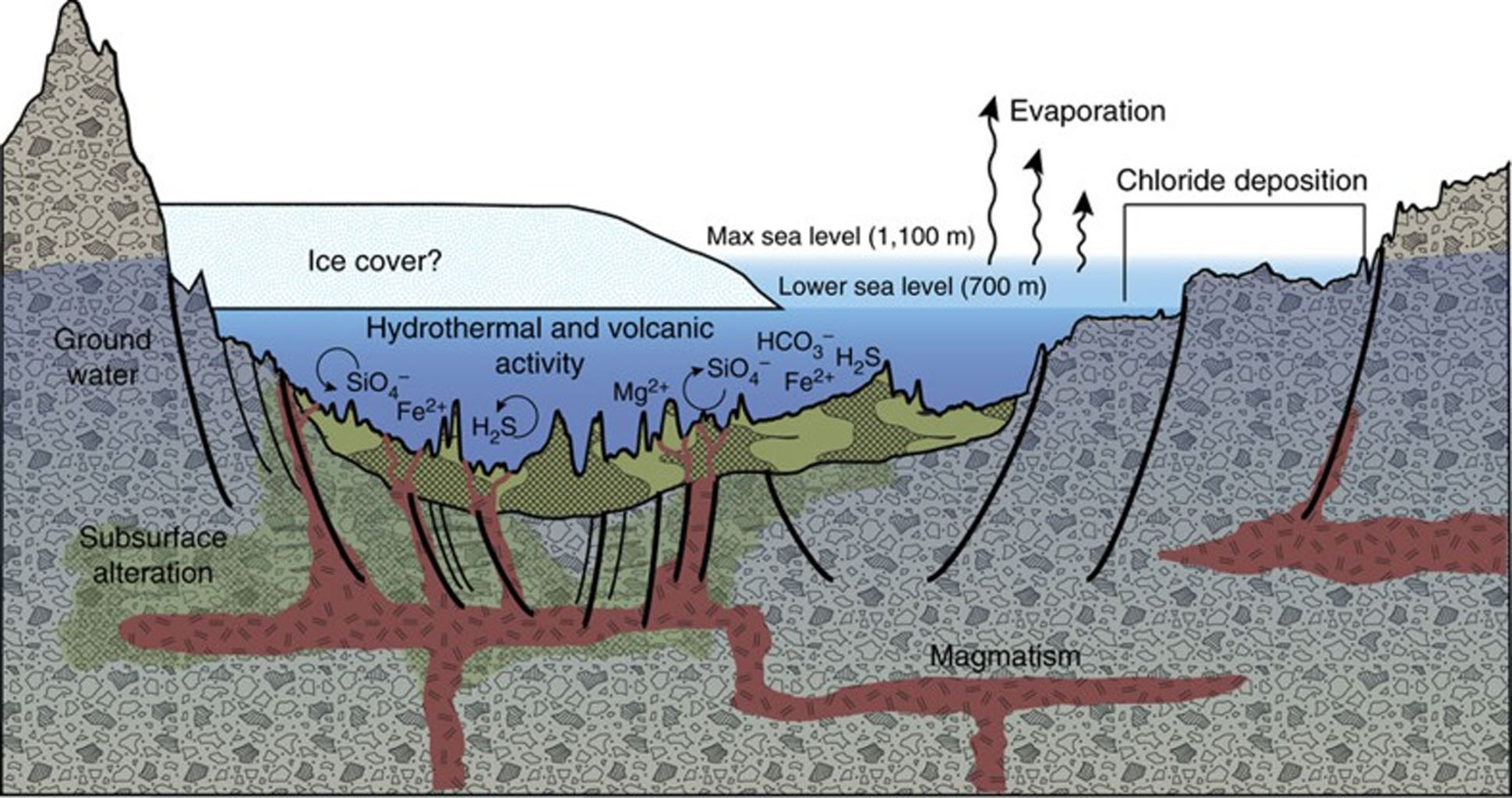
Diagram showing how volcanic activity may have caused deposition of minerals on floor of Eridania Sea. Chlorides were deposited along the shoreline by evaporation.

== Branched channels ==
Research, in the January 2010 issue of Icarus, described strong evidence for sustained precipitation in the area around Valles Marineris. The types of minerals there are associated with water. Also, the high density of small branching channels indicates a great deal of precipitation because they are similar to stream channels on the Earth.

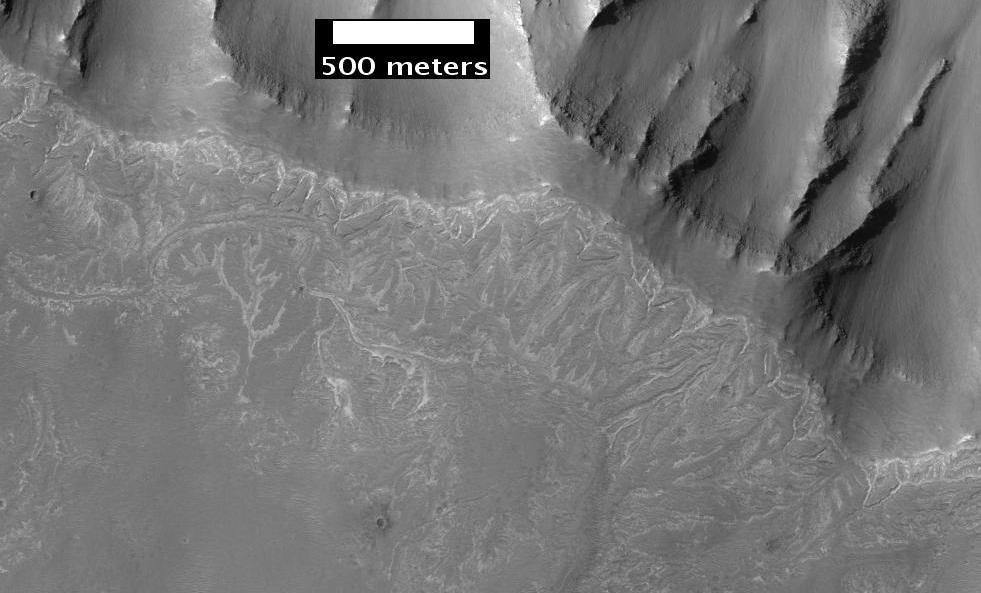
Channels near the rim of Ius Chasma, as seen by HiRISE. The pattern and high density of these channels support precipitation as the source of the water. Location is Coprates quadrangle.

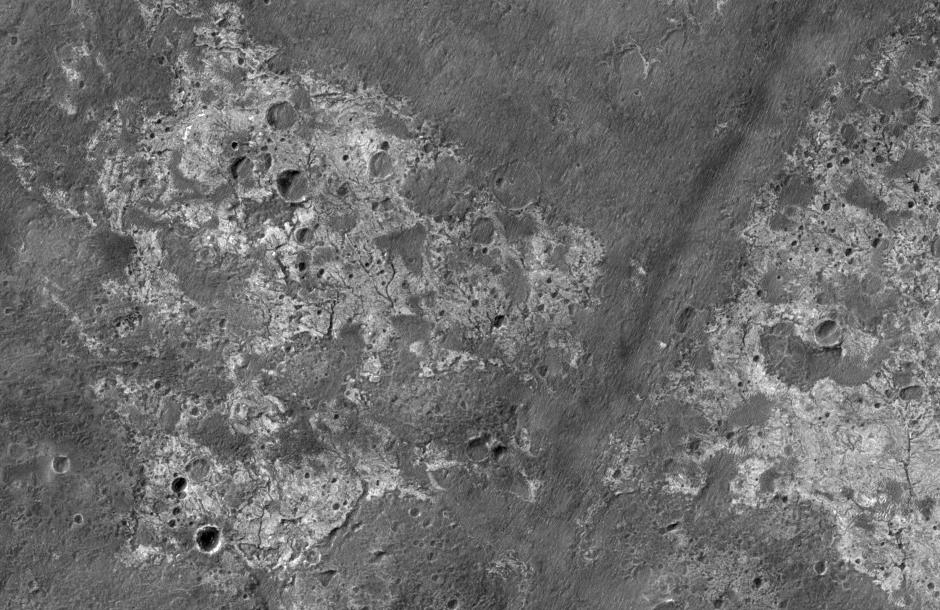
Channels in Candor plateau, as seen by HiRISE. Location is Coprates quadrangle. Click on image to see many small, branched channels which are strong evidence for sustained precipitation.

== Inverted relief ==
Some places on Mars show inverted relief. In these locations, a stream bed appears as a raised feature, instead of a depression. The inverted former stream channels may be caused by the deposition of large rocks or due to cementation of loose materials. In either case erosion would erode the surrounding land and consequently leave the old channel as a raised ridge because the ridge will be more resistant to erosion. Images below, taken with HiRISE show sinuous ridges that are old channels that have become inverted.

In an article published in January 2010, a large group of scientists endorsed the idea of searching for life in Miyamoto Crater because of inverted stream channels and minerals that indicated the past presence of water.

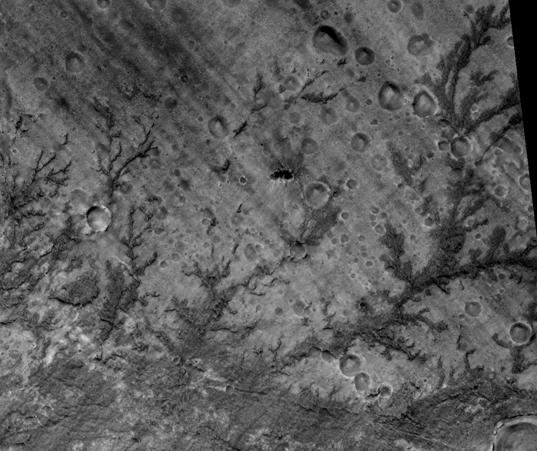
Inverted Stream Channels in Antoniadi Crater. Location is Syrtis Major quadrangle.

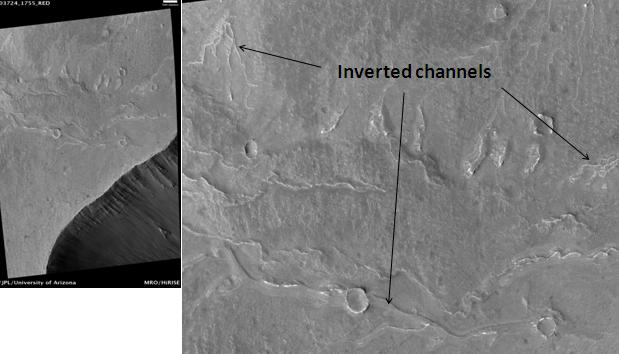
Inverted Channels near Juventae Chasma. Channels were once regular stream channels. Scale bar is 500 meters long. Location is Coprates quadrangle.

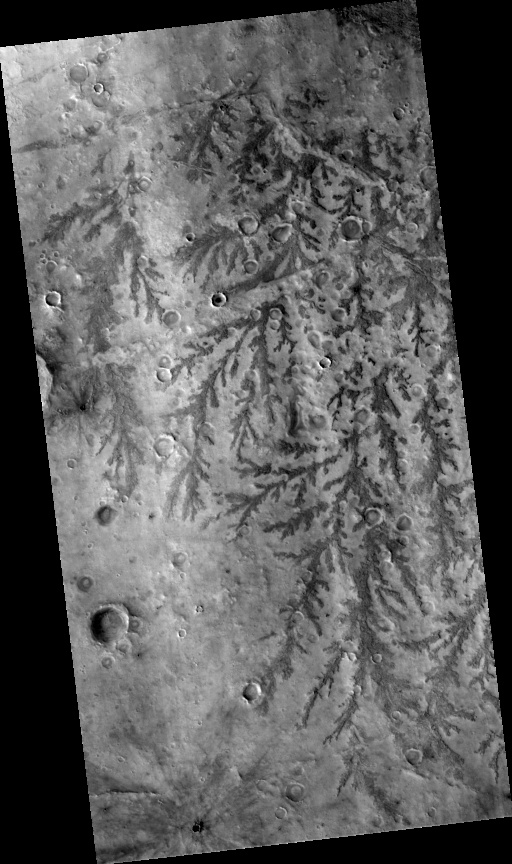
Inverted Channel with many branches in Syrtis Major quadrangle.

Example of inverted terrain in Parana Valles region, as seen by HiRISE under the HiWish program.

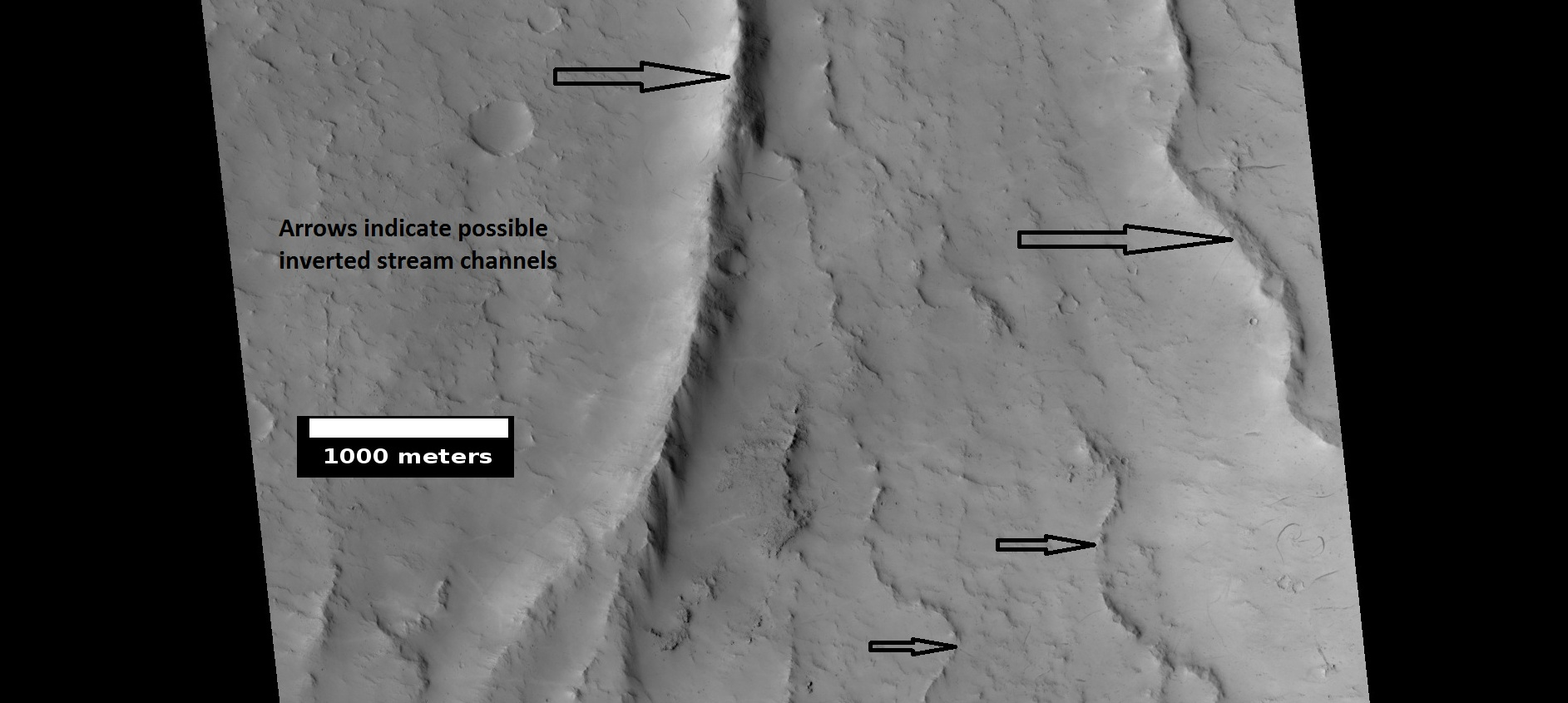
Possible inverted stream channels, as seen by HiRISE under HiWish program. The ridges were probably once stream valleys that have become full of sediment and cemented. So, they became hardened against erosion which removed surrounding material. Illumination is from the left (west).

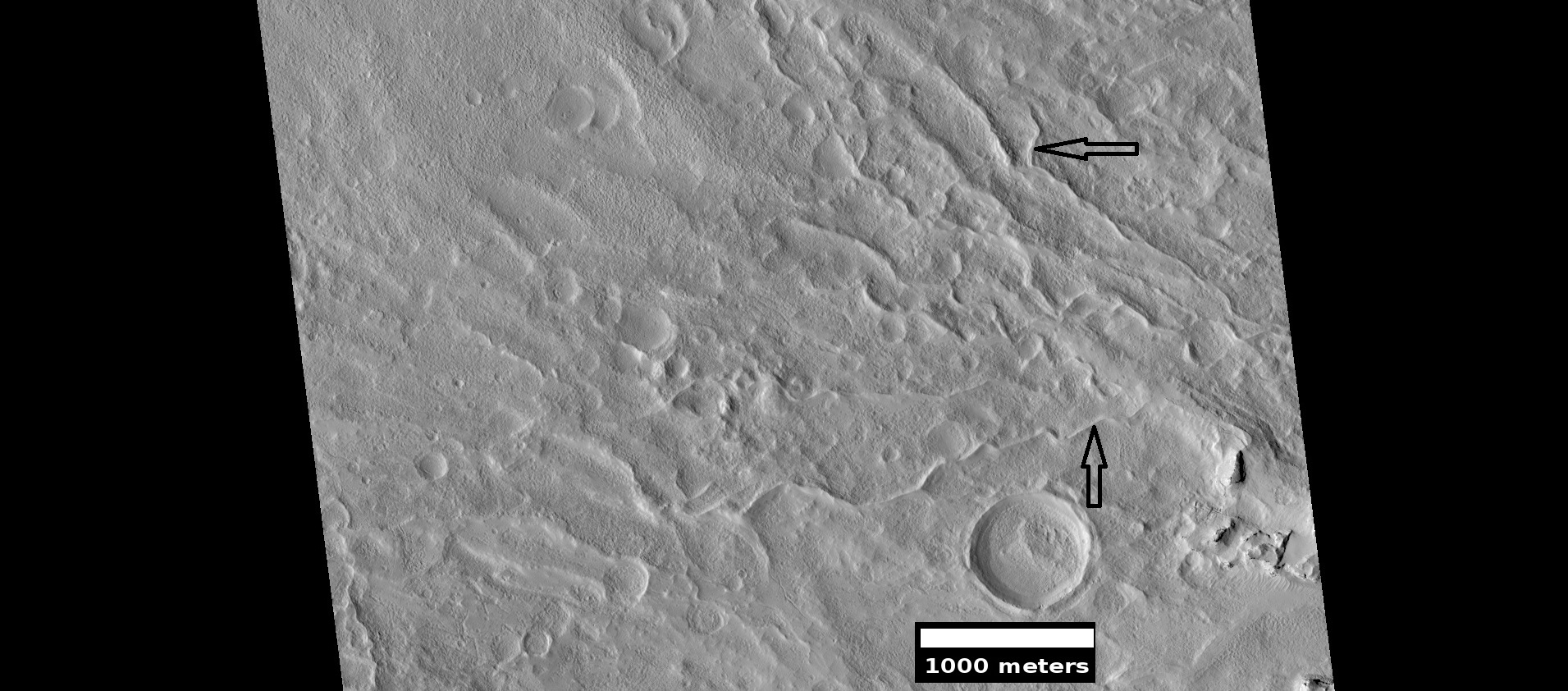
Inverted stream channels on crater slope, as seen by HiRISE under HiWish program Location is Diacria quadrangle.

== Chloride deposits ==
Using data from Mars Global Surveyor, Mars Odyssey and the Mars Reconnaissance Orbiter, scientists have found widespread deposits of chloride minerals. Some of these chloride deposits have been identified to be a mixture of anhydrous chloride salt and regional basaltic regolith. These are located in the southern highlands of Mars. Usually chlorides are the last minerals to come out of solution. A picture below shows some deposits within the Phaethontis quadrangle. Evidence suggests that the deposits were formed from the evaporation of mineral-enriched waters. Lakes may have been scattered over large areas of the Martian surface. Carbonates, sulfates, and silica should precipitate out ahead of them. Sulfates and silica have been discovered by the Mars rovers. Places with chloride minerals may have once held various life forms. Furthermore, such areas should preserve traces of ancient life.

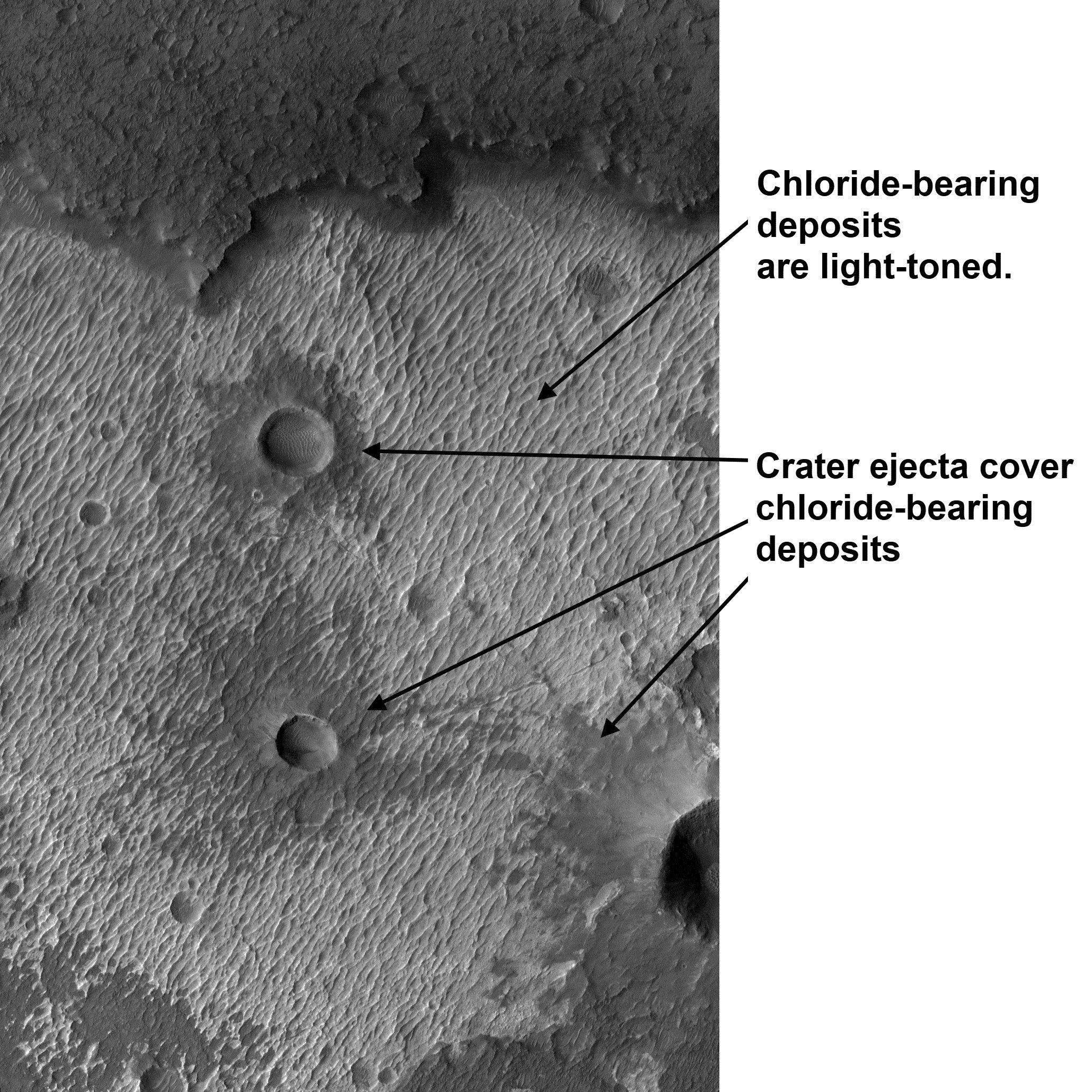
Evidence of water from chloride deposits in Phaethontis quadrangle. Picture from HiRISE.

== Layers ==
Rocks on Mars have been found to frequently occur as layers, called strata, in many different places. Columbus Crater is one of many craters that contain layers. Rock can form layers in a variety of ways. Volcanoes, wind, or water can produce layers. Many places on Mars show rocks arranged in layers. Scientists are happy about finding layers on Mars since layers may have formed under large bodies of water. Layers may be formed by groundwater rising up depositing minerals and cementing sediments. The hardened layers are consequently more protected from erosion. This process may occur instead of layers forming under lakes.

Sometimes the layers display different colors. Light-toned rocks on Mars have been associated with hydrated minerals like sulfates. The Mars rover Opportunity examined such layers close-up with several instruments. Some layers are probably made up of fine particles because they seem to break up into fine dust. In contrast, other layers break up into large boulders so they are probably much harder. Basalt, a volcanic rock, is thought to form layers composed of boulders. Basalt has been identified all over Mars. Instruments on orbiting spacecraft have detected clay (also called phyllosilicates) in some layers. Scientists are excited about finding hydrated minerals such as sulfates and clays on Mars because they are usually formed in the presence of water. Places that contain clays and/or other hydrated minerals would be good places to look for evidence of life.

More research using data collected by the SHARAD (SHAllow RAdar Detector) on the MRO has found layers of ice-water interspersed with dirt at the northern pole under the Planum Boreum. The layering is believed to have come from the global warming and cooling cycle on Mars; during cooling periods, water migrated to the poles and formed the ice-water layers, while on subsequent warming, the unthawed ice water was covered by layers of dust and dirt from windstorms on the surface, helping to preserve the ice water.

Below are a few of the many examples of layers that have been studied with HiRISE.

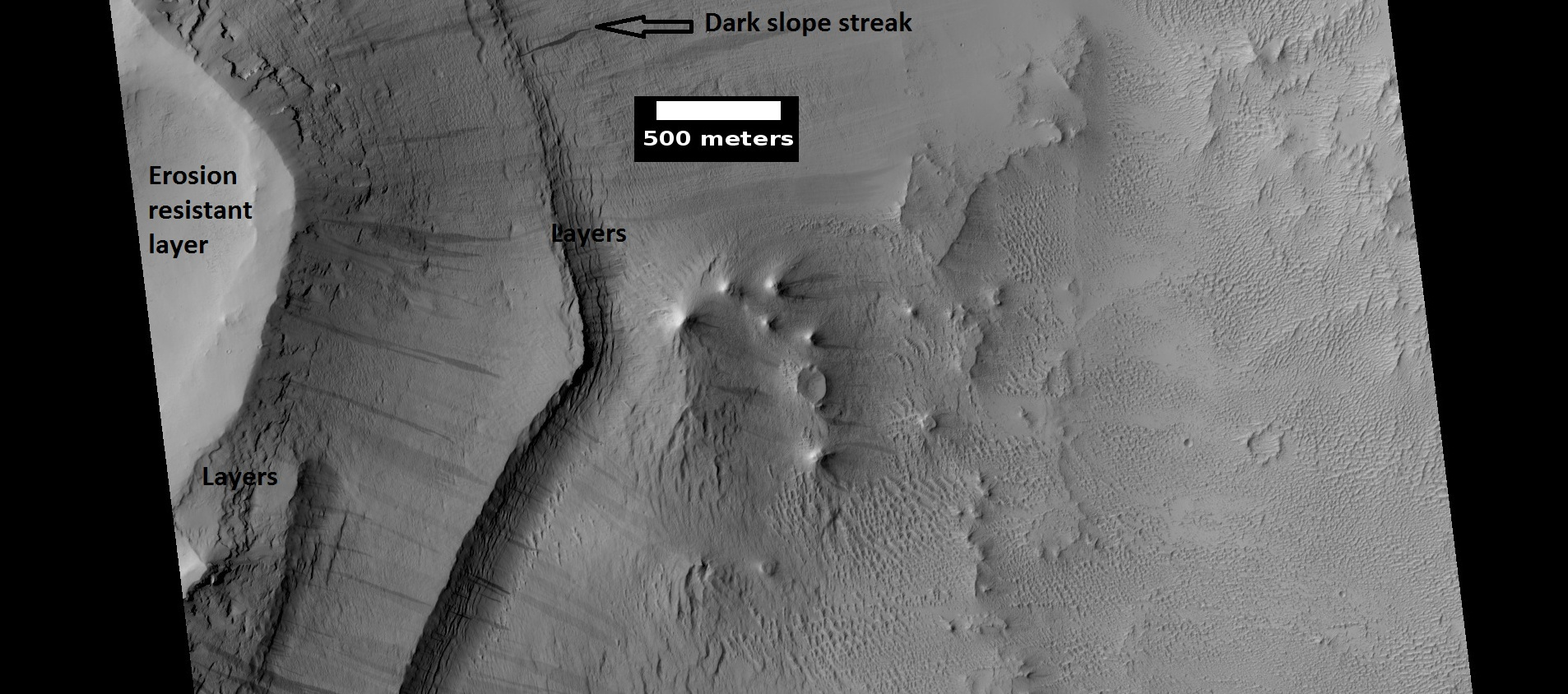
Layers under cap rock of a pedestal crater, as seen by HiRISE under HiWish program. Pedestal crater is within the much larger Tikhonravov Crater.

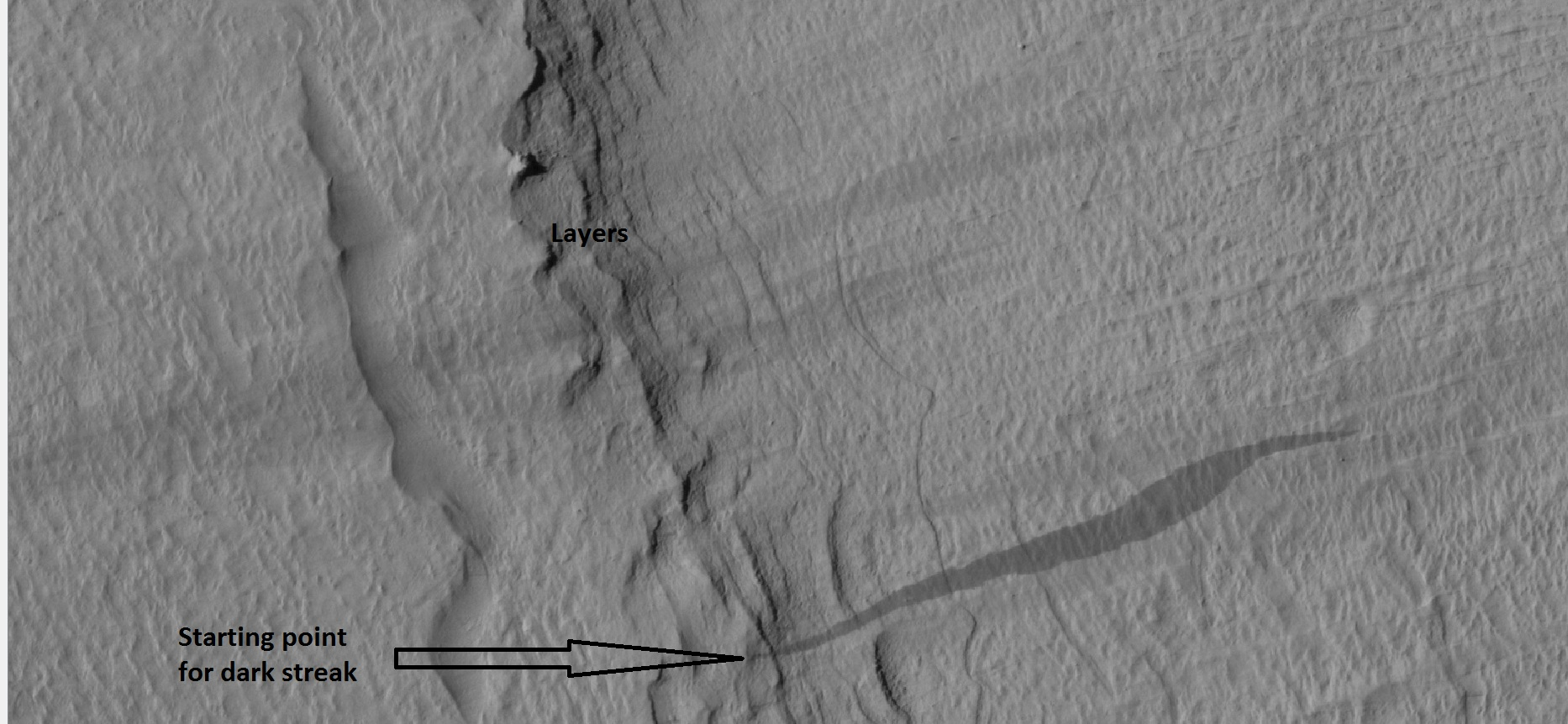
Close-up of some layers under cap rock of a pedestal crater and a dark slope streak, as seen by HiRISE under HiWish program.

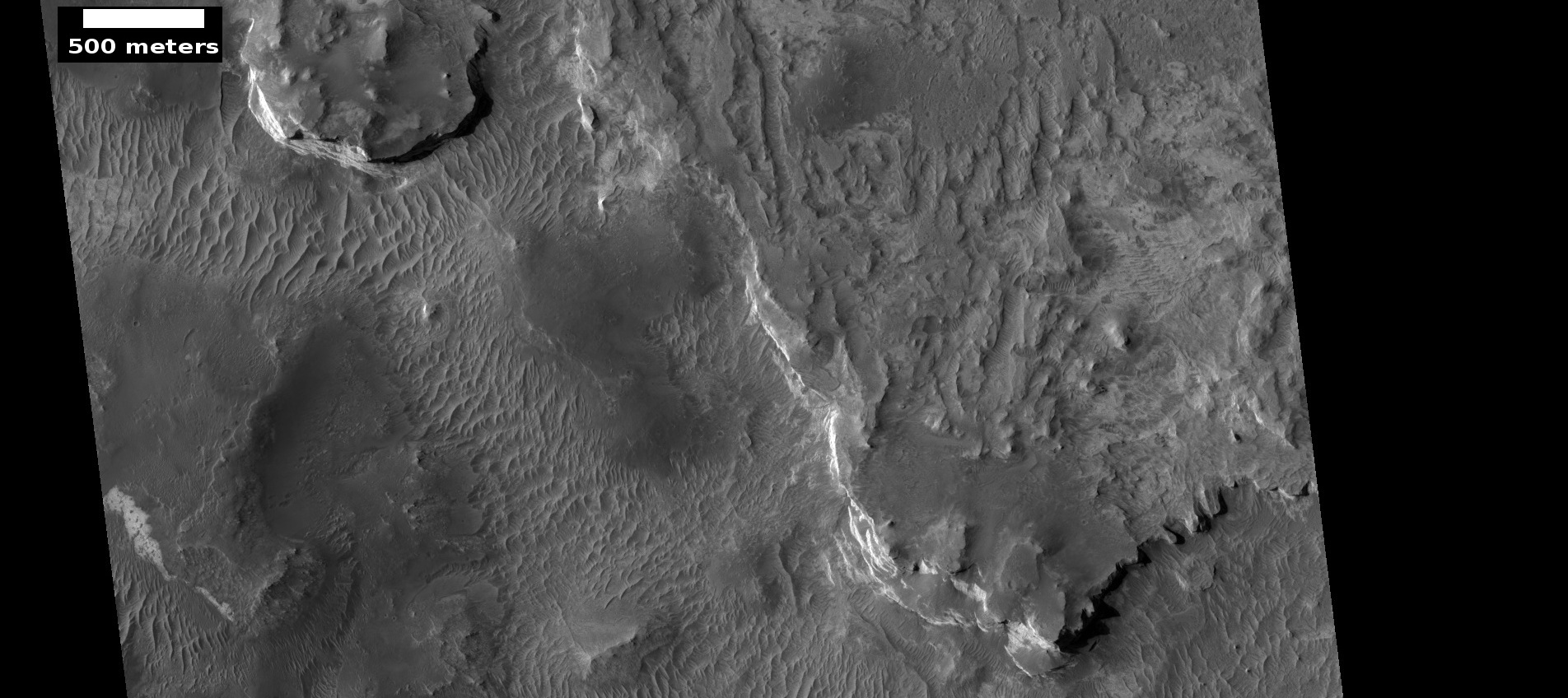
Layers in Arabia, as seen by HiRISE under HiWish program.

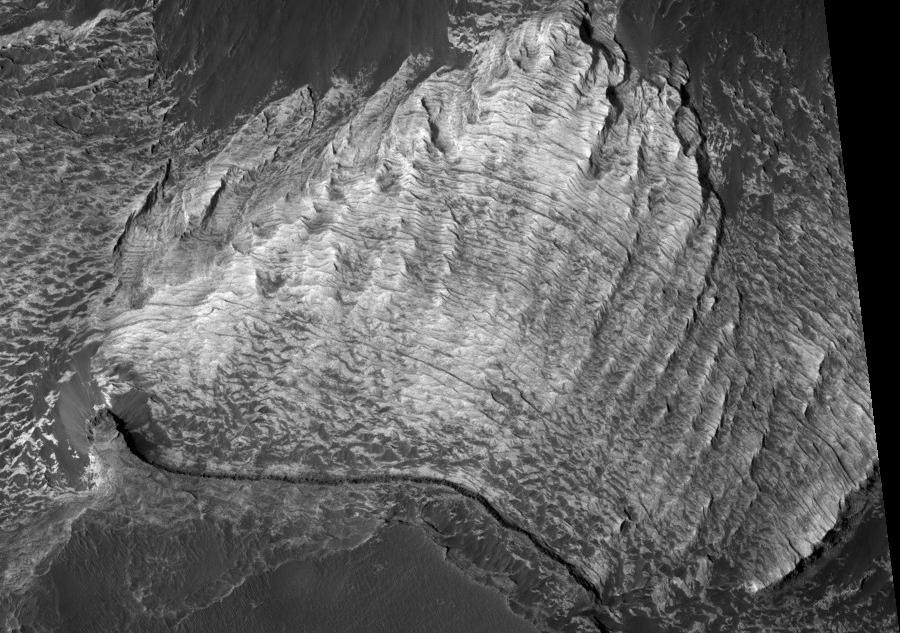
Light colored layers in Eos Chaos. Location is Coprates quadrangle.

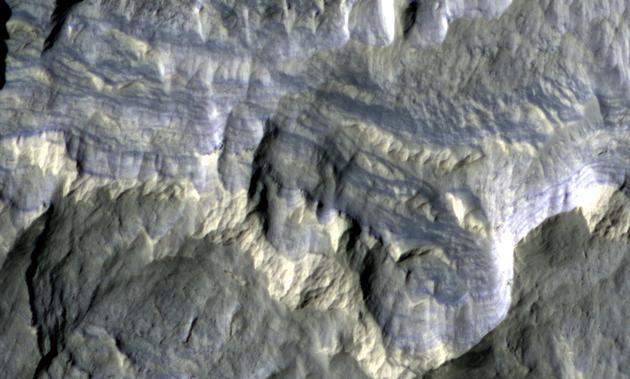
Columbus Crater Layers. This false-color image is about 800 feet across. Some of the layers contain hydrated minerals. Location is Memnonia quadrangle.

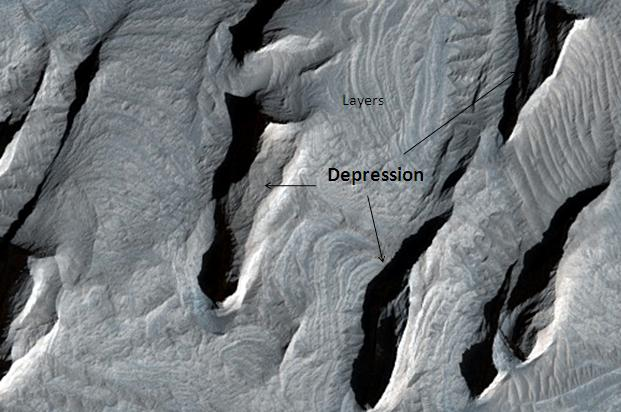
Tithonium Chasma. Location is Coprates quadrangle.

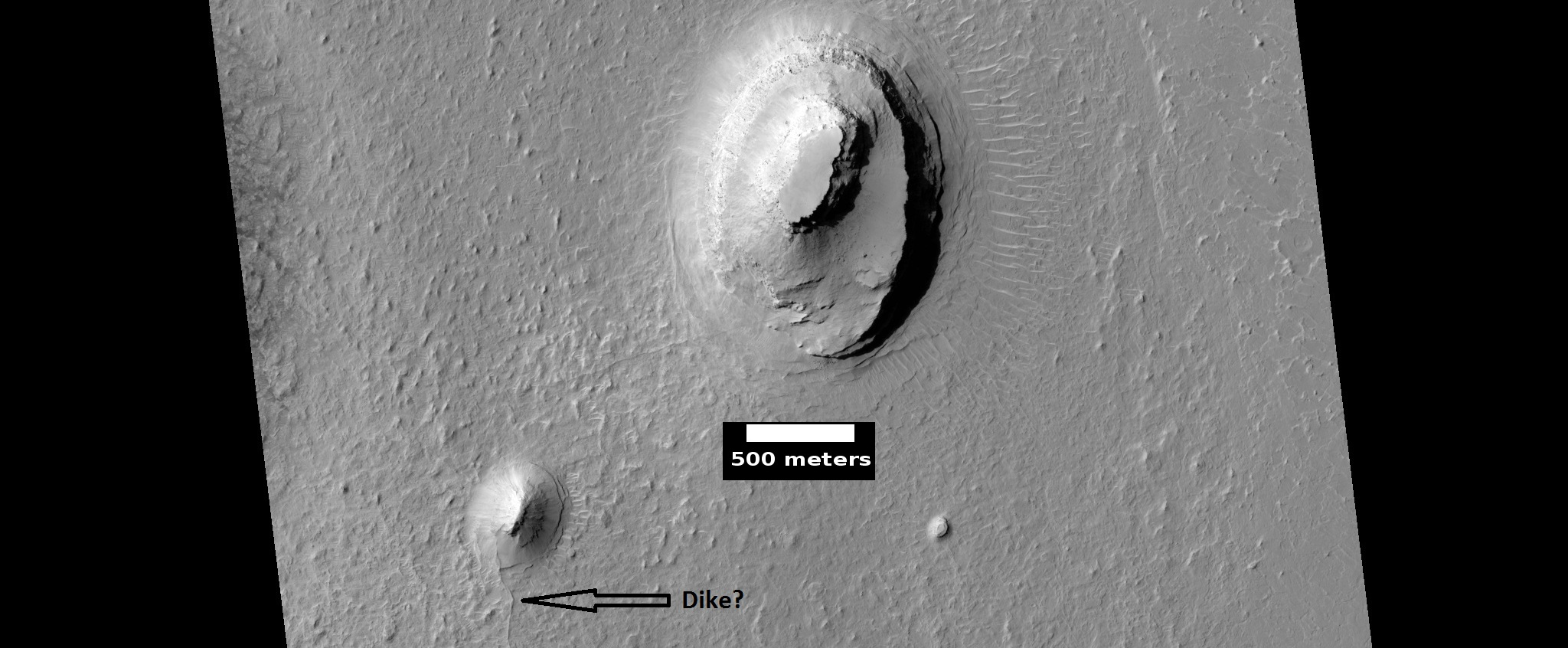
Buttes, as seen by HiRISE under HiWish program. Buttes have layered rocks with a hard resistant cap rock on the top which protects the underlying rocks from erosion.

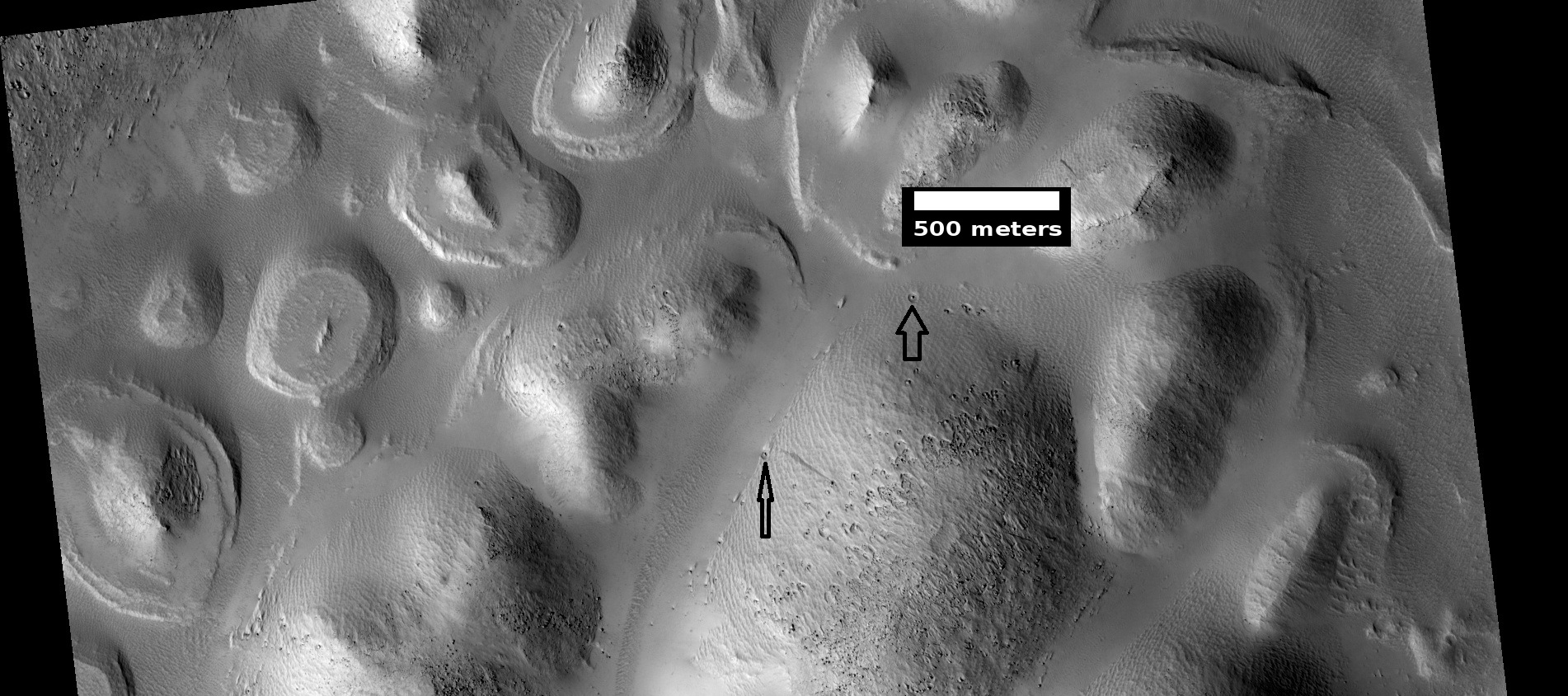
Layers exposed at the base of a group of buttes in Mangala Valles in Memnonia quadrangle, as seen by HiRISE under HiWish program. Arrows point to boulders sitting in pits. The pits may have formed by winds, heat from the boulders melting ground ice, or some other process.

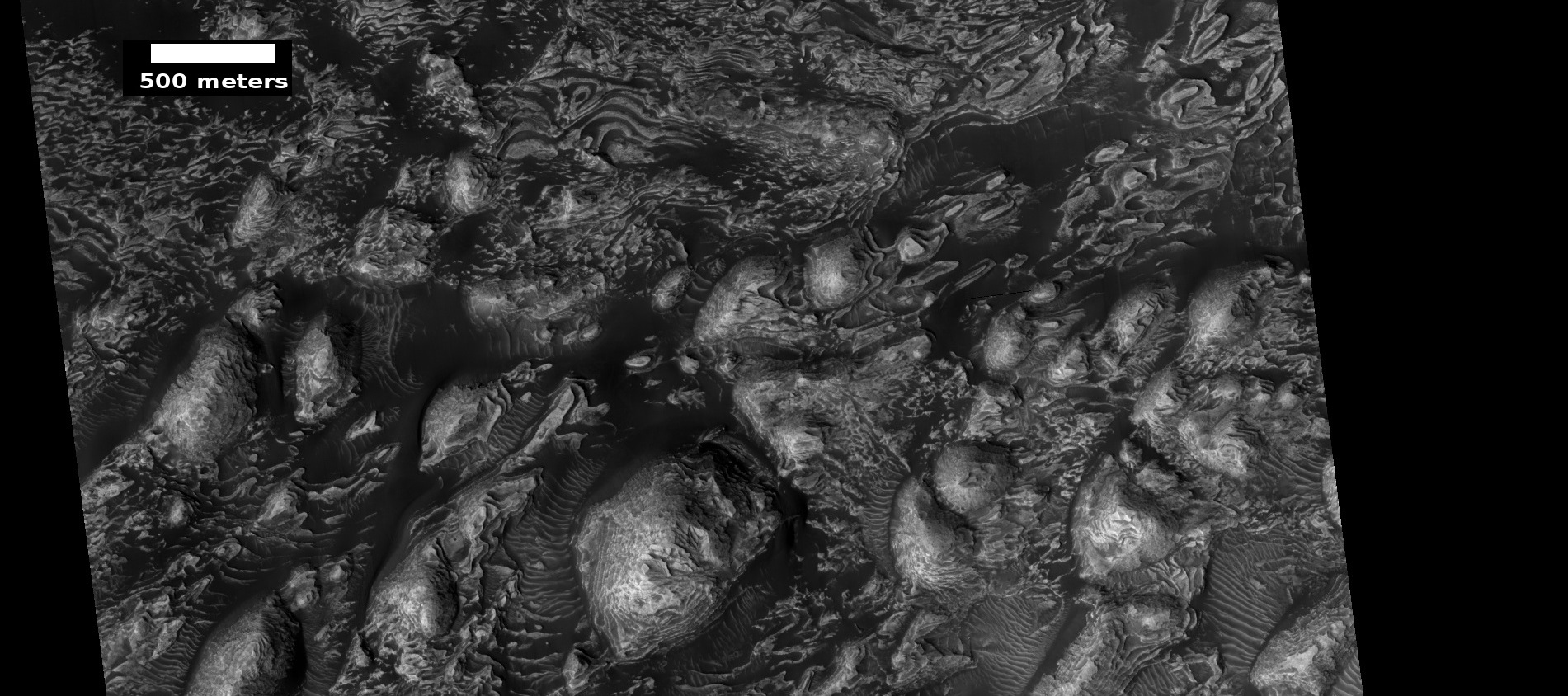
Layers in Firsoff Crater, as seen by HiRISE under HiWish program

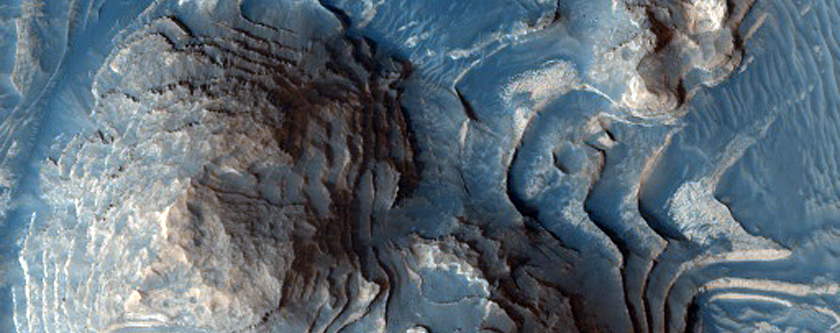
Close-up of layers in Firsoff Crater, as seen by HiRISE Note: this is an enlargement of the previous image of Firsoff Crater.

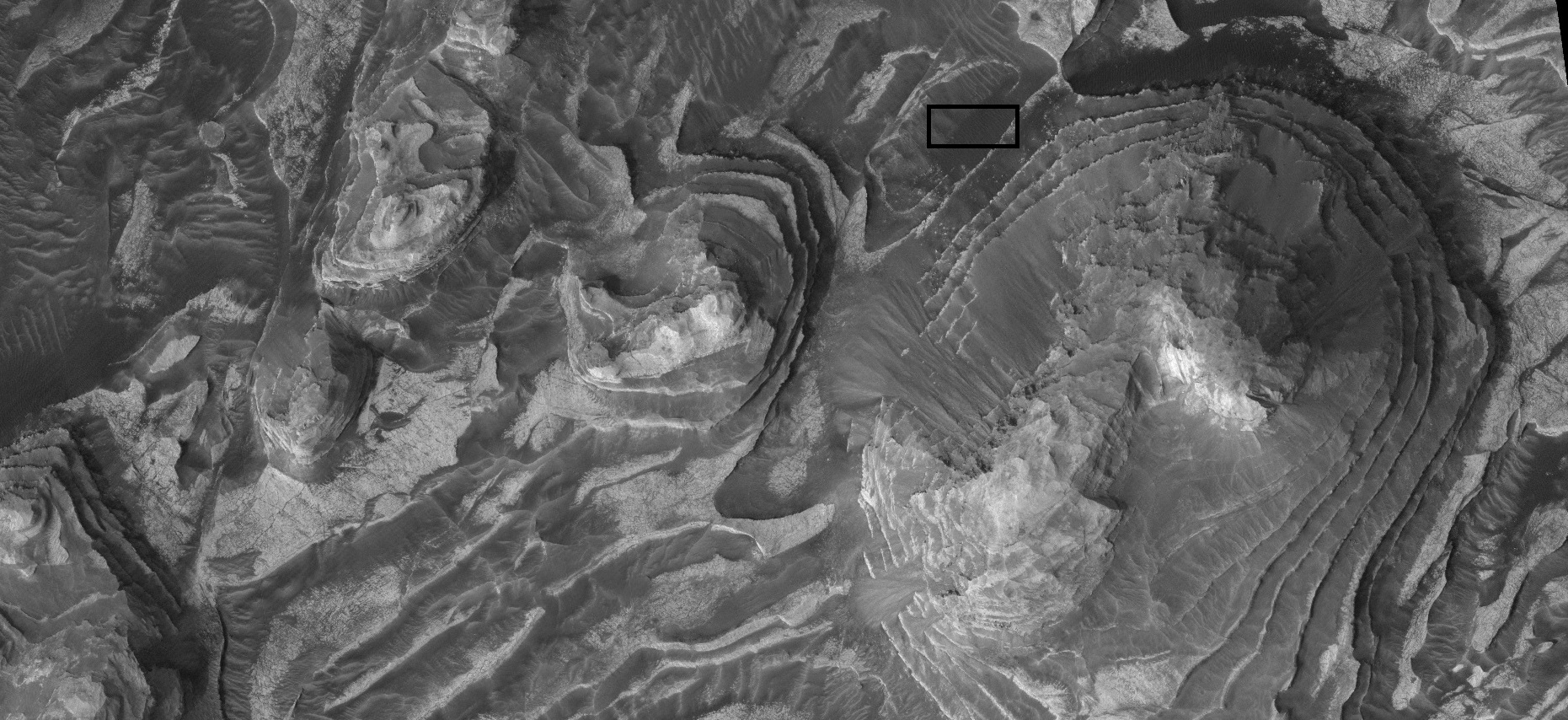
Layers in Firsoff crater with a box showing the size of a football field Picture taken by HiRISE under HiWish program.

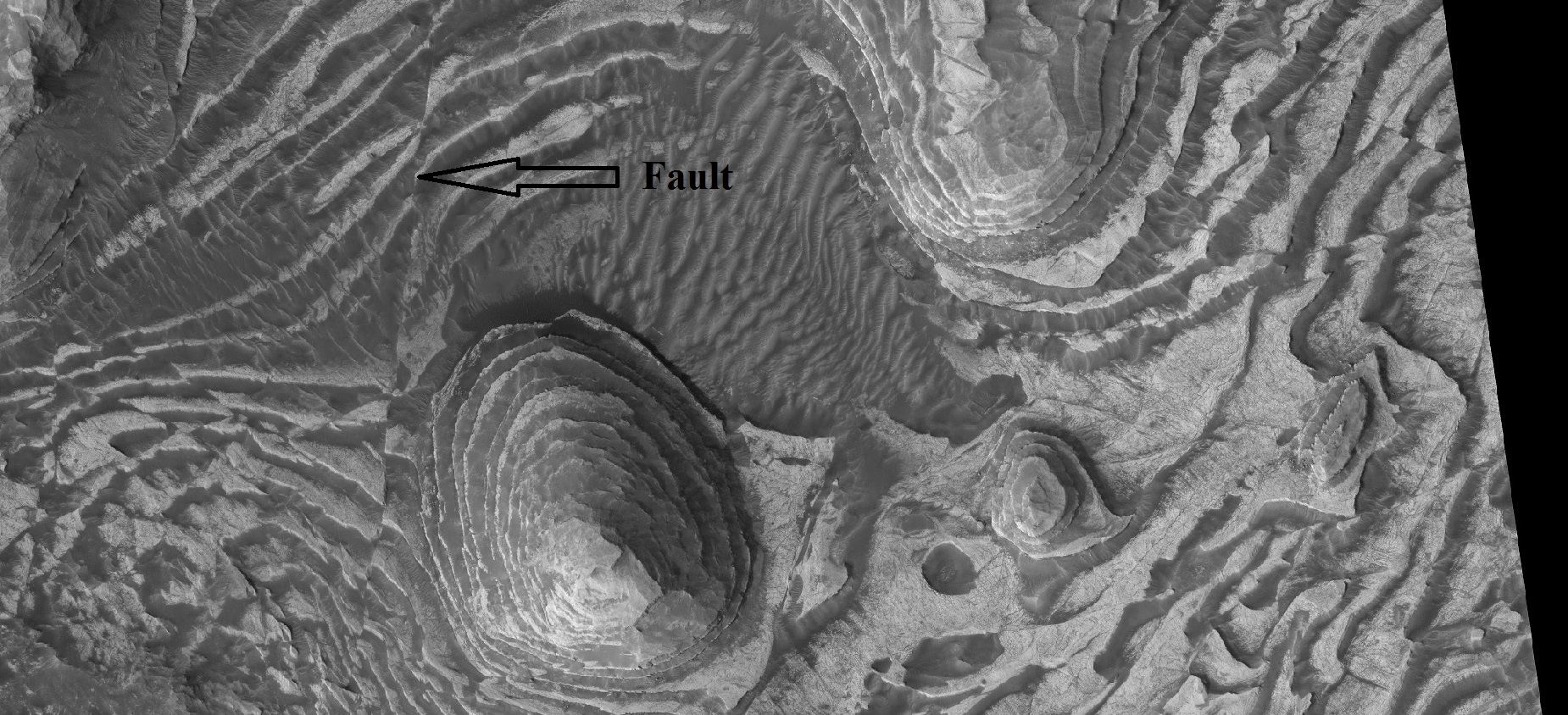
Layers and faults in Firsoff Crater, as seen by HiRISE under HiWish program. Arrows show one large fault, but there are other smaller ones in the picture.

== Mantle ==
Much of the surface of Mars is covered by a thick smooth mantle that is thought to be a mixture of ice and dust. This ice-rich mantle, a few yards thick, smooths the land. But in places it displays a bumpy texture, resembling the surface of a basketball. Because there are few craters on this mantle, the mantle is relatively young.

It's generally accepted that mantle is ice-rich dust that fell from the sky as snow and ice-coated dust grains during a different climate One evidence of its ice-rich nature is the presence of gullies which form when some of the ice melts.

The images below, all taken with HiRISE, show a variety of views of this smooth mantle.

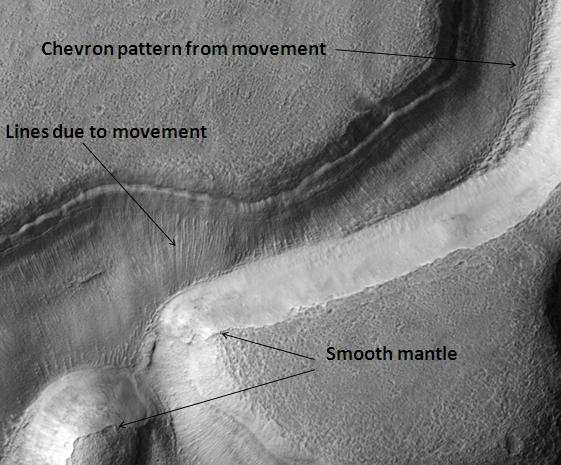
Niger Vallis with features typical of this latitude. Chevron pattern results from movement of ice-rich material. Click on image to see chevron pattern and mantle. Location is Hellas quadrangle.

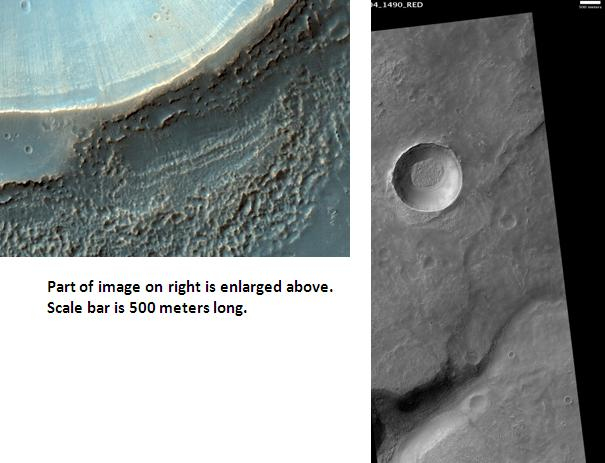
Dissected Mantle with layers. Location is Noachis quadrangle.

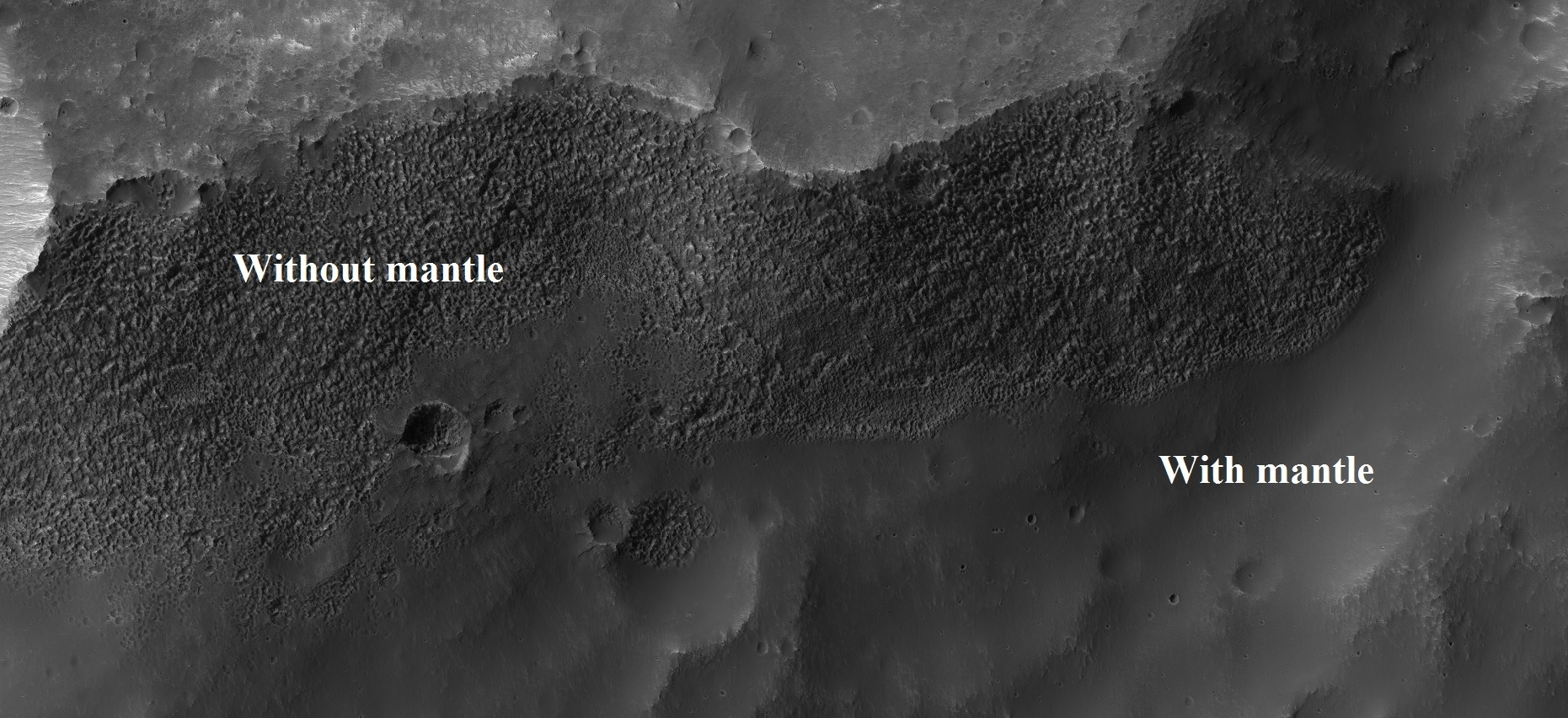
Surface showing appearance with and without mantle covering, as seen by HiRISE, under the HiWish program. Location is Terra Sirenum in Phaethontis quadrangle.

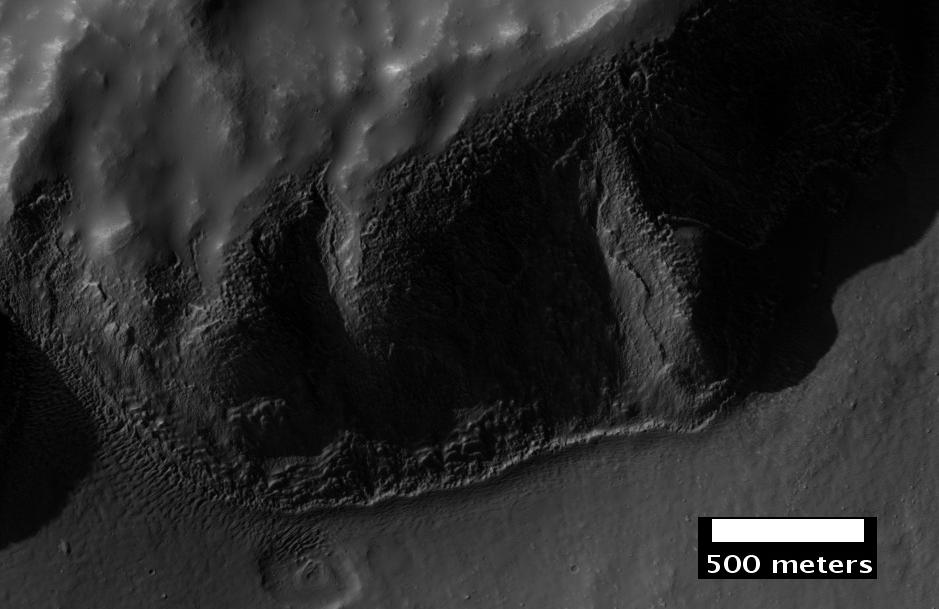
Layers in mantle deposit, as seen by HiRISE, under the HiWish program. Mantle was probably formed from snow and dust falling during a different climate. Location is Thaumasia quadrangle.

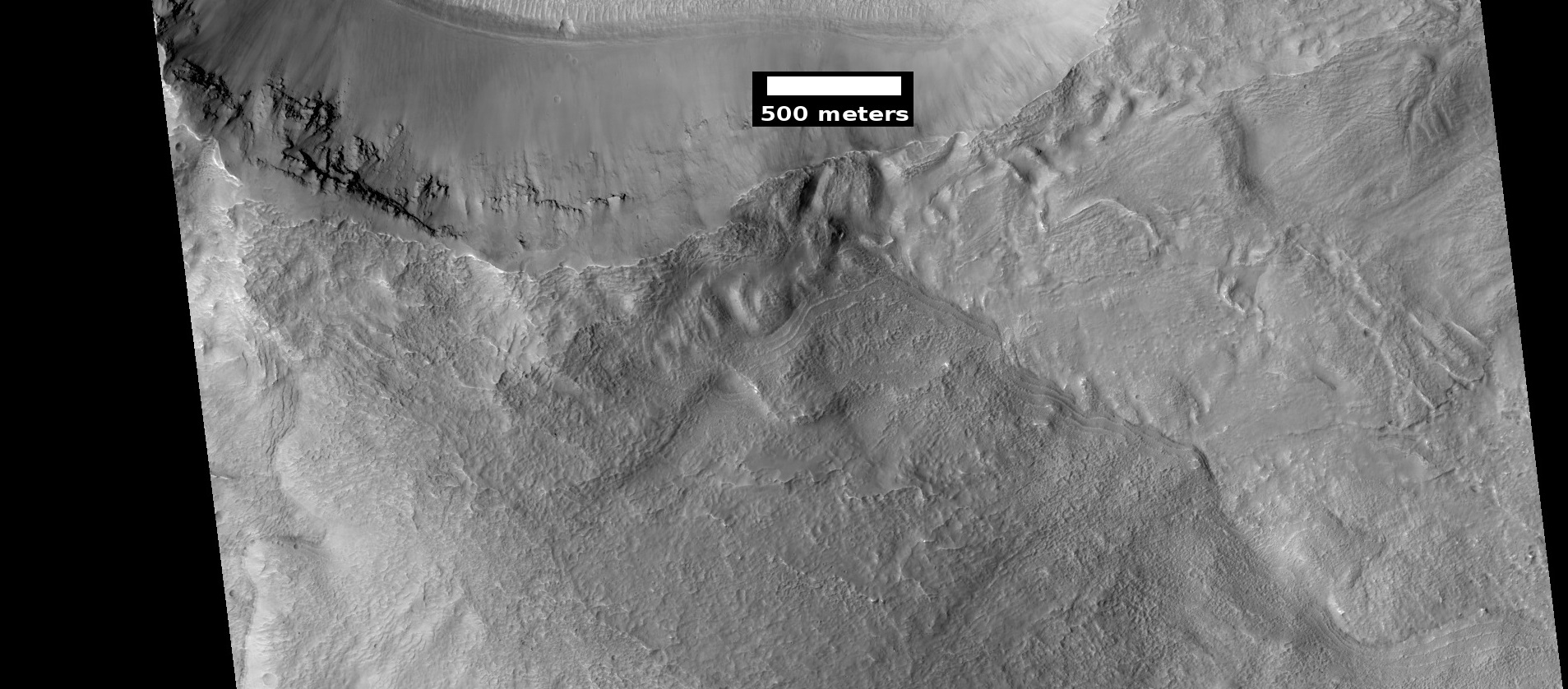
HiRISE image showing smooth mantle covering parts of a crater in the Phaethontis quadrangle. Along the outer rim of the crater, the mantle is displayed as layers. This suggests that the mantle was deposited multiple times in the past. Picture was taken with HiRISE under HiWish program. The layers are enlarged in the next image.

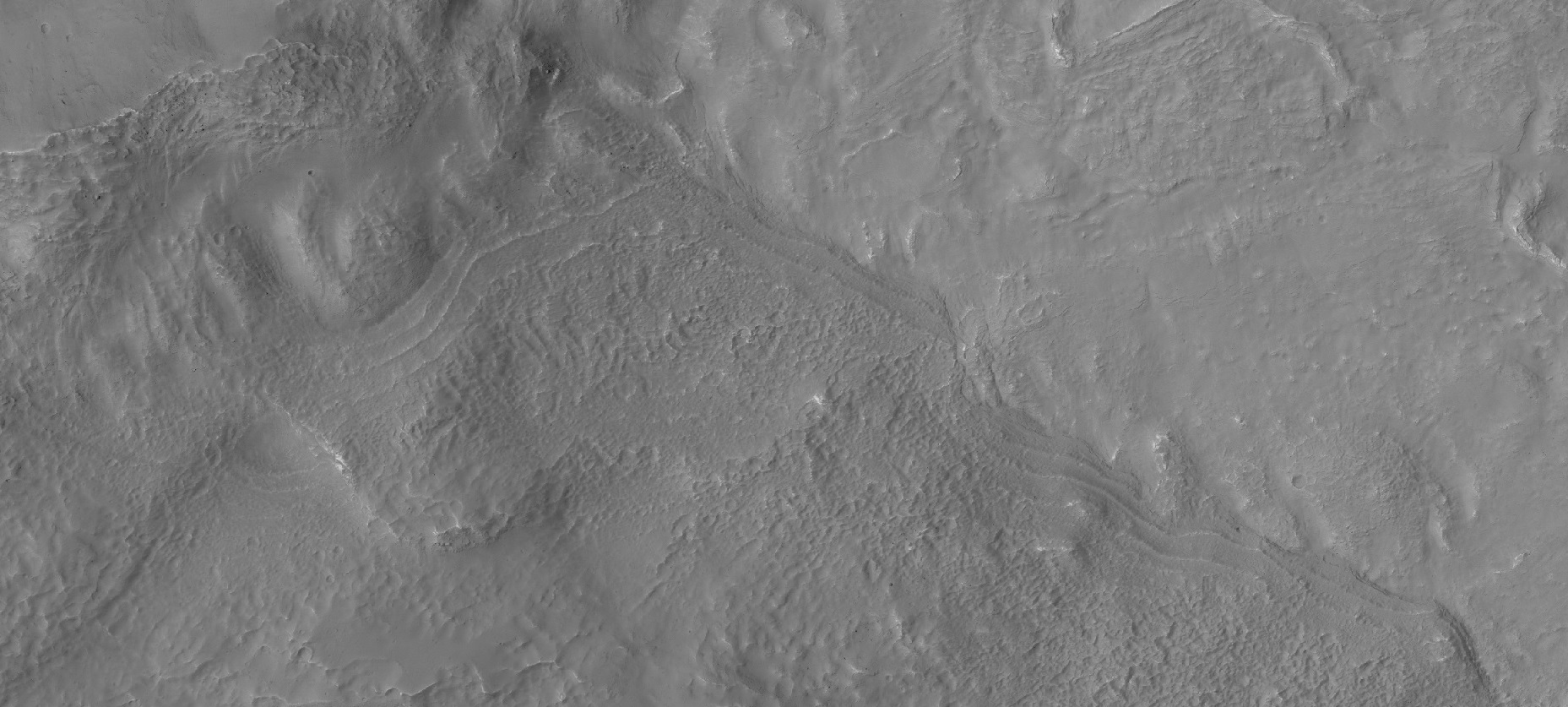
Enlargement of previous image of mantle layers. Four to five layers are visible. Location is the Phaethontis quadrangle.

== Ring mold craters ==
Ring mold craters are kind of Martian craters that look like the ring molds used in baking. They are thought to be caused by an impact into ice. The ice is covered by a layer of debris. They are found in parts of Mars that have buried ice. Laboratory experiments confirm that impacts into ice result in a "ring mold shape". Impacts into ice warm the ice and cause it to flow into the ring mold shape.

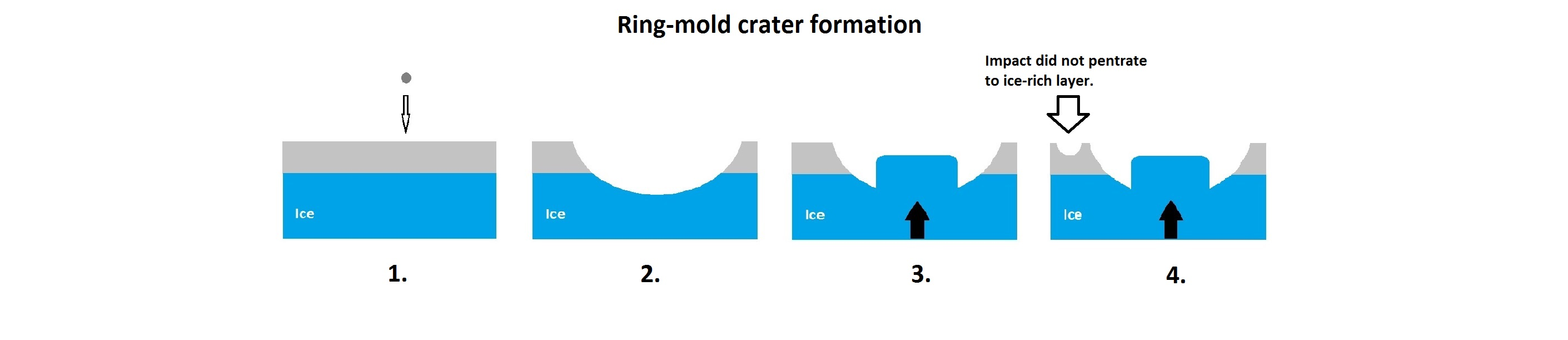
Ring-mold craters form when an impact goes through to an ice layer. The rebound forms the ring-mold shape, and then dust and debris settle on the top to insulate the ice.

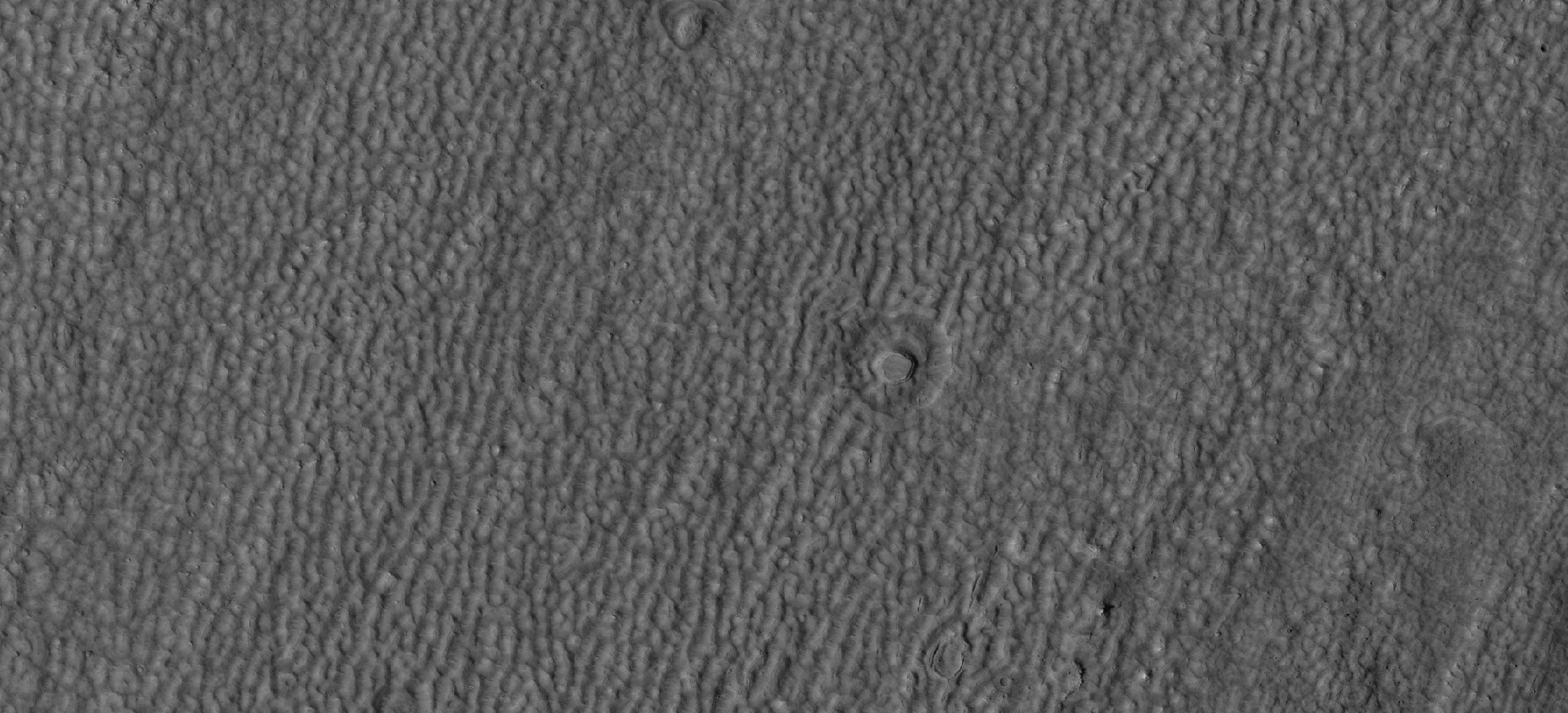
Ring mold craters on floor of a crater, as seen by HiRISE under HiWish program Location is Ismenius Lacus quadrangle.

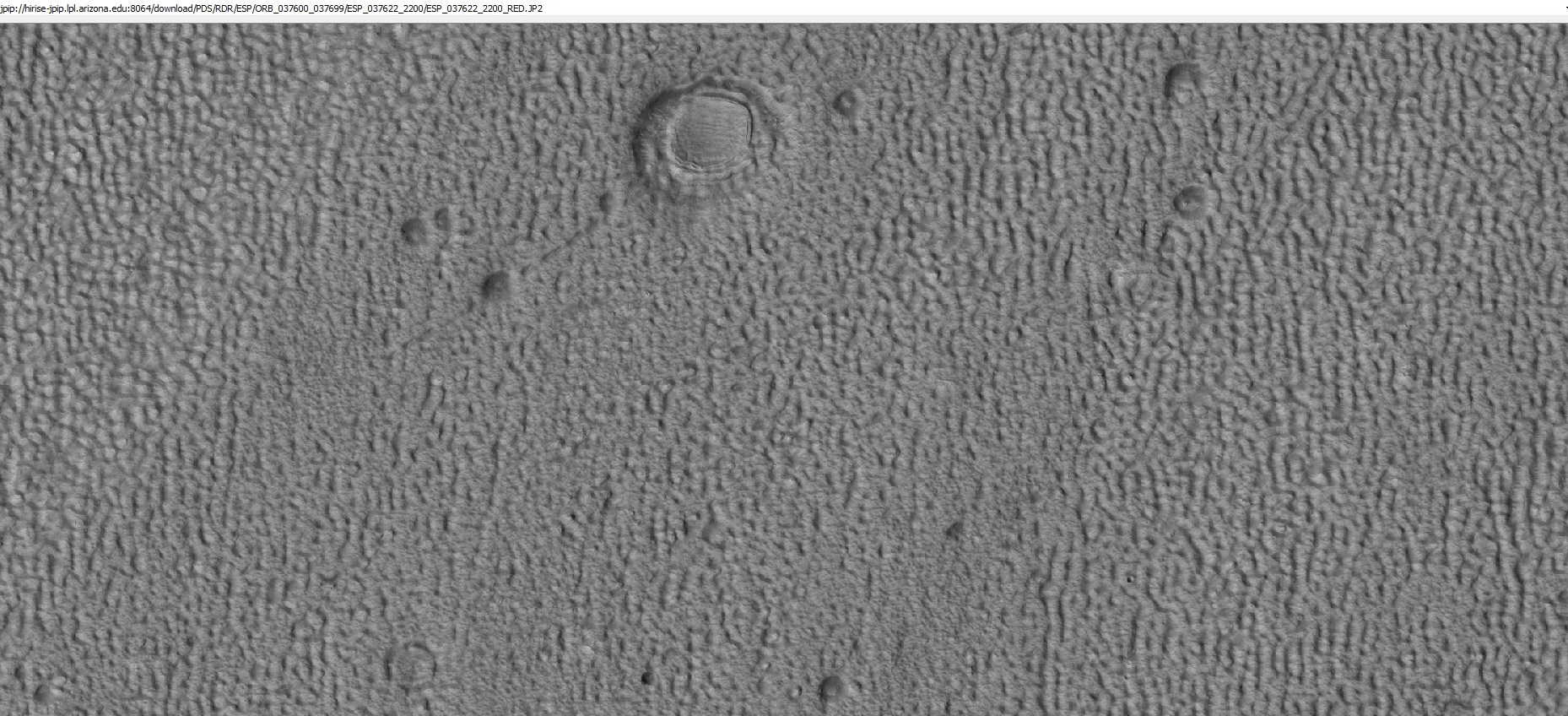
Ring mold craters of various sizes on floor of a crater, as seen by HiRISE under HiWish program Location is Ismenius Lacus quadrangle.

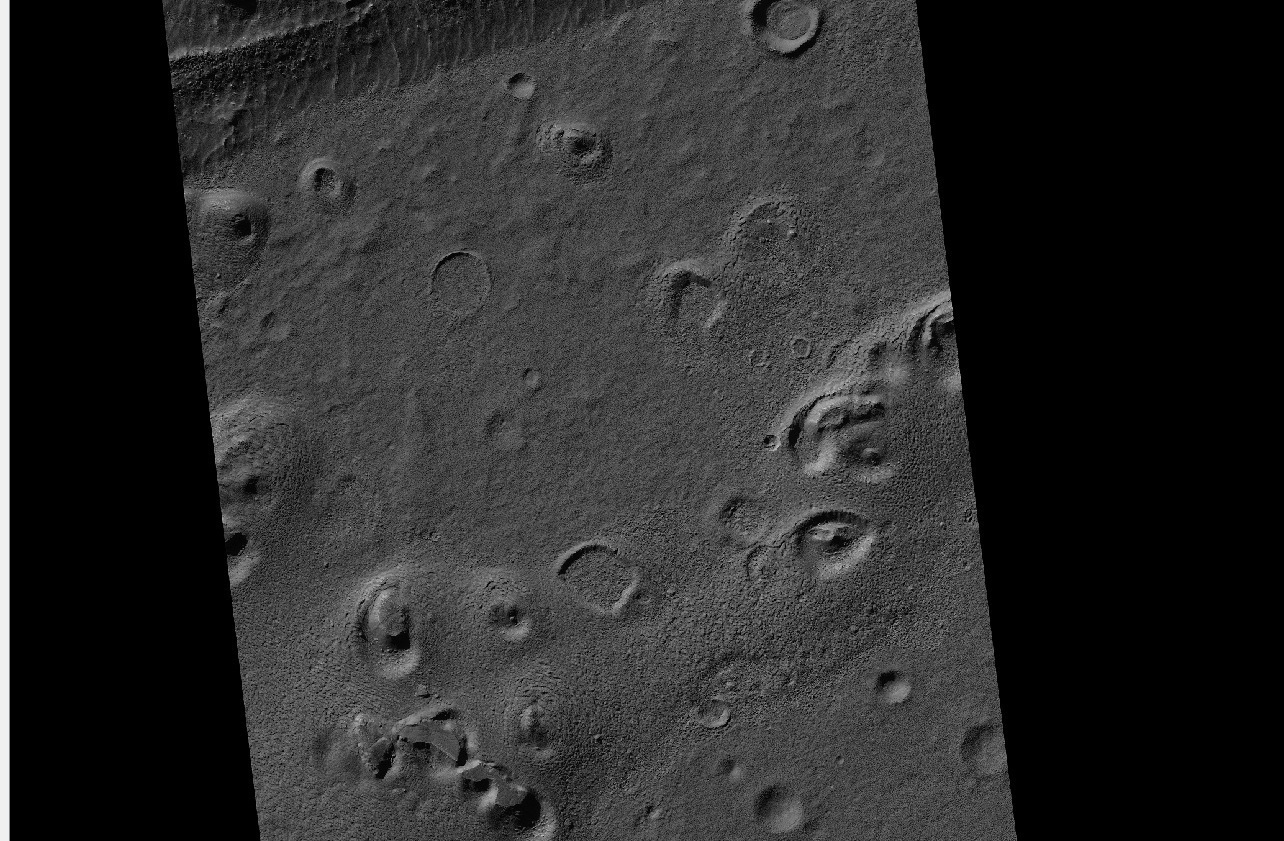
Wide view of a field of ring mold craters, as seen by HiRISE under HiWish program

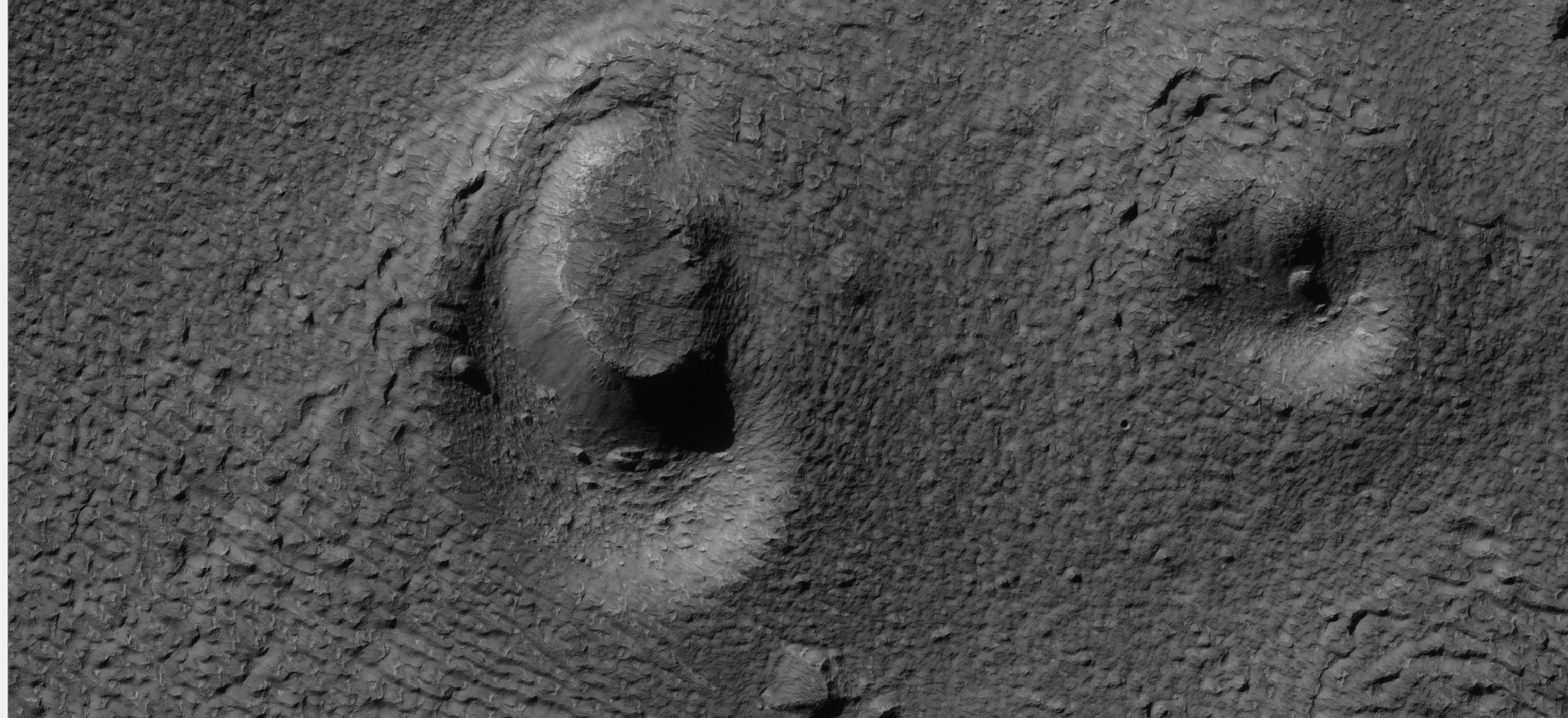
Close view of ring mold crater, as seen by HiRISE under HiWish program Note: this is an enlargement of the previous image of a field of ring mold craters.

== Gullies ==
Changes in Mars's orbit and tilt cause significant changes in the distribution of water ice from polar regions down to latitudes equivalent to Texas. During certain climate periods water vapor leaves polar ice and enters the atmosphere. The water returns to the ground at lower latitudes as deposits of frost or snow mixed generously with dust. The atmosphere of Mars contains a great deal of fine dust particles. Water vapor condenses on the particles, then they fall down to the ground due to the additional weight of the water coating. When ice at the top of the mantling layer goes back into the atmosphere, it leaves behind dust, which insulates the remaining ice.

HiRISE has carried out many observations of gullies that are assumed to have been caused by recent flows of liquid water. Many gullies are imaged over and over to see if any changes occur. Some repeat observations of gullies have displayed changes that some scientists argue were caused by liquid water over the period of just a few years. Others say the flows were merely dry flows. These were first discovered by the Mars Global Surveyor.

Alternate theories for the creation of surface gullies and channels include wind erosion, liquid carbon dioxide, and liquid methane.

Observations with HiRISE show widespread activity in southern hemisphere gullies, especially in those that appear fresh. Significant channel incision and large-scale mass movements have been seen. The timing of gully activity is seasonal and happens during the period when seasonal frost is present and defrosting.

Observations over the past few years support a model in which currently active gully formation is driven mainly by seasonal CO_{2} frost. Simulations described in a 2015 conference, show that high pressure CO_{2} gas trapping in the subsurface can cause debris flows. The conditions that can lead to this are found in latitudes where gullies occur. This research was described in a later article entitled, "Formation of gullies on Mars by debris flows triggered by CO2 sublimation." In the model, CO_{2} ice accumulates in the cold winter. It piles up on a frozen permafrost layer that consists of ice-cemented dirt. When the higher intensity sunlight of spring begins, light penetrates the translucent dry ice layer, consequently warming the ground. The CO_{2} ice absorbs heat and sublimates—that is changes directly from a solid to a gas. This gas builds up pressure because it is trapped between the ice and the frozen ground. Eventually, pressure builds up enough to explode through the ice taking with it soil particles. The dirt particles mix with the pressurized gas and act as a fluid that can flow down the slope and carve gullies.

Below are some of the many hundreds of gullies that have been studied with HiRISE.

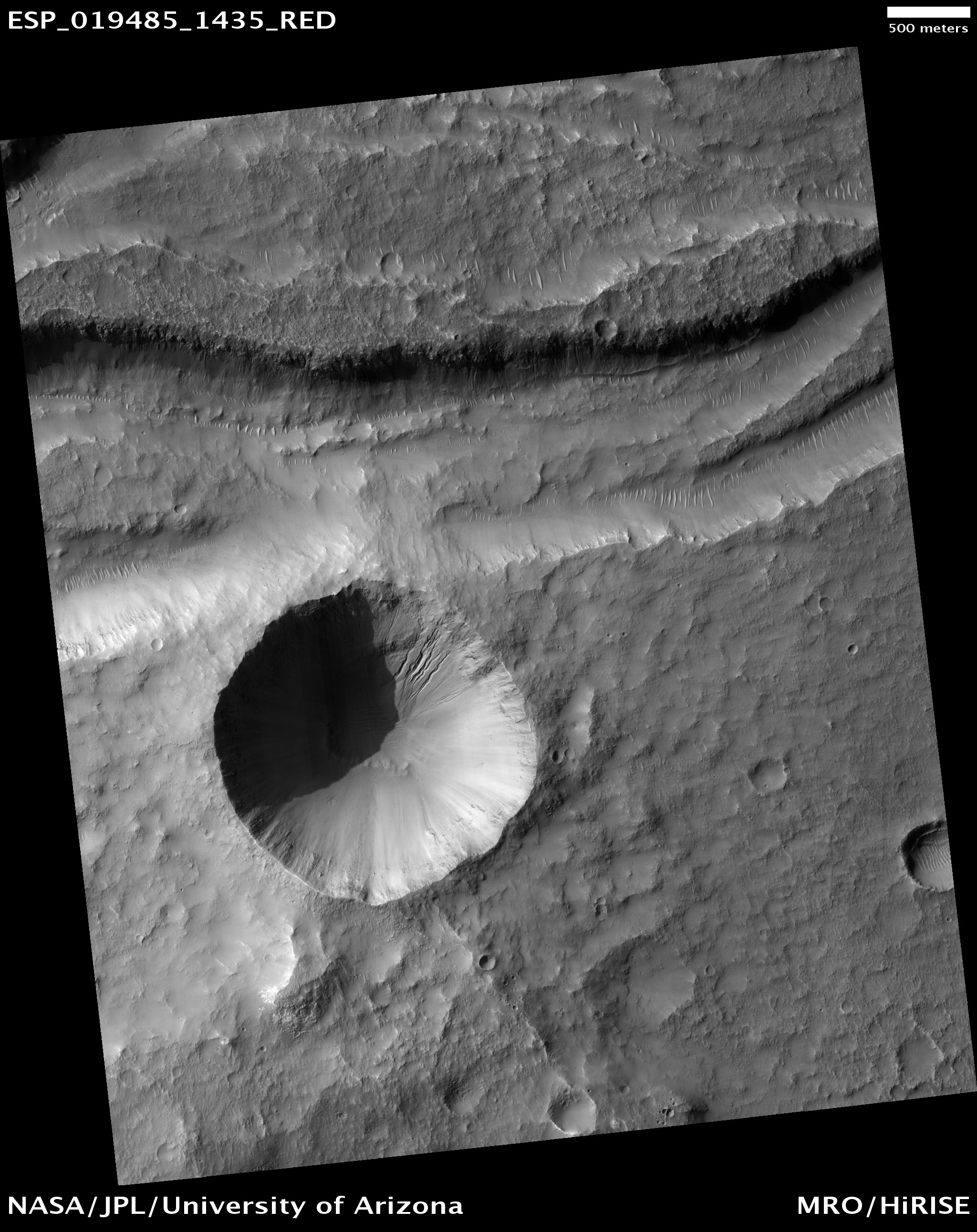
Gullies in a trough and nearby crater, as seen by HiRISE under the HiWish program. Scale bar is 500 meters long. Location is Phaethontis quadrangle.

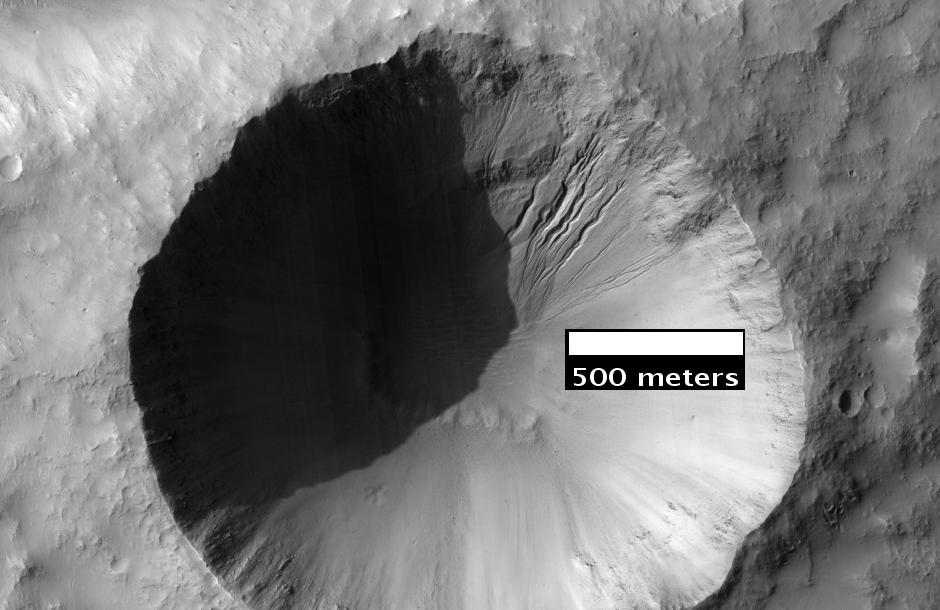
Close-up of gullies in crater, as seen by HiRISE under the HiWish program. Location is Phaethontis quadrangle.

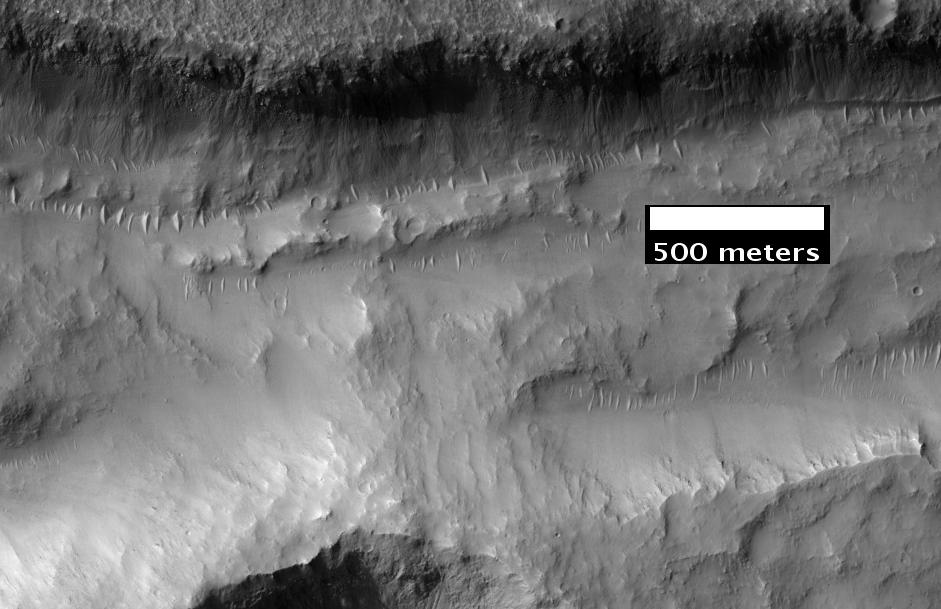
Close-up of gullies in trough, as seen by HiRISE under the HiWish program. These are some of the smaller gullies visible on Mars. Location is Phaethontis quadrangle.

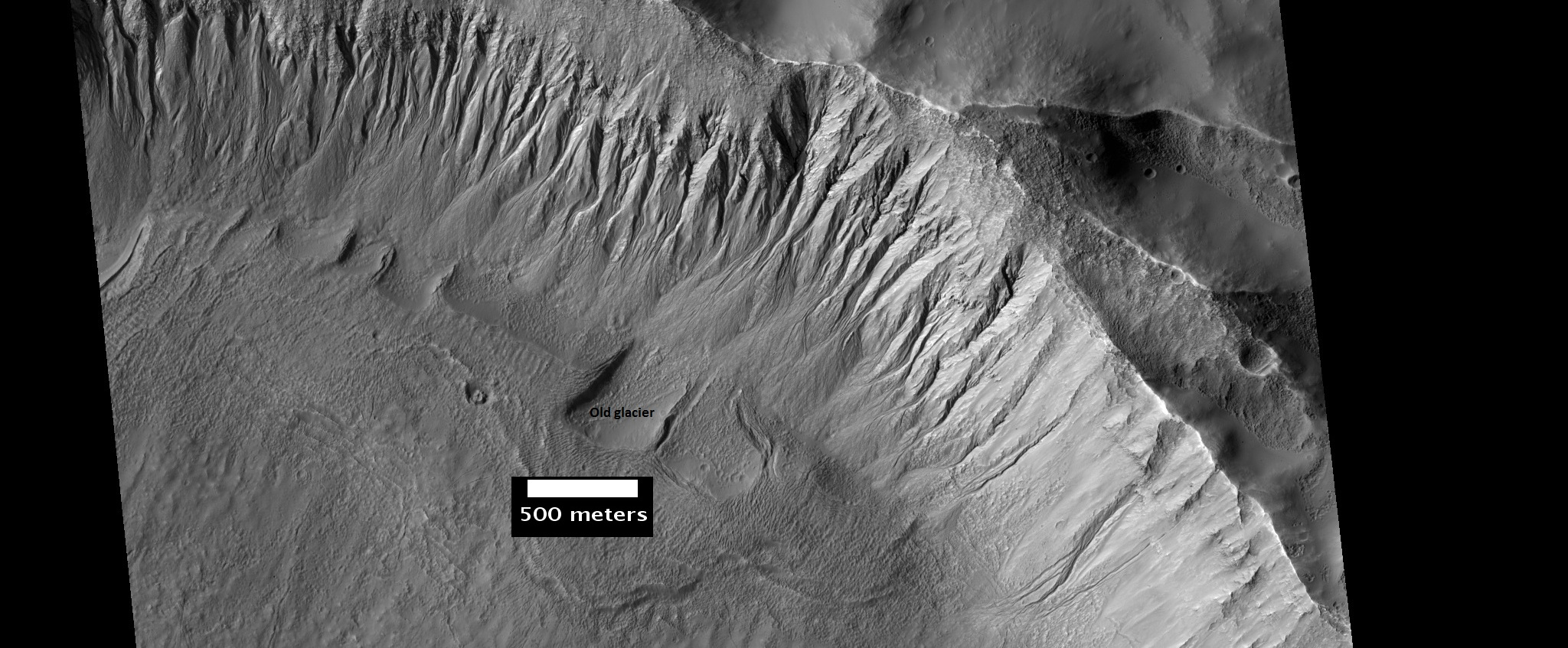
Gullies near Newton Crater, as seen by HiRISE, under the HiWish program. Place where there was an old glacier is labeled. Image from Phaethontis quadrangle.

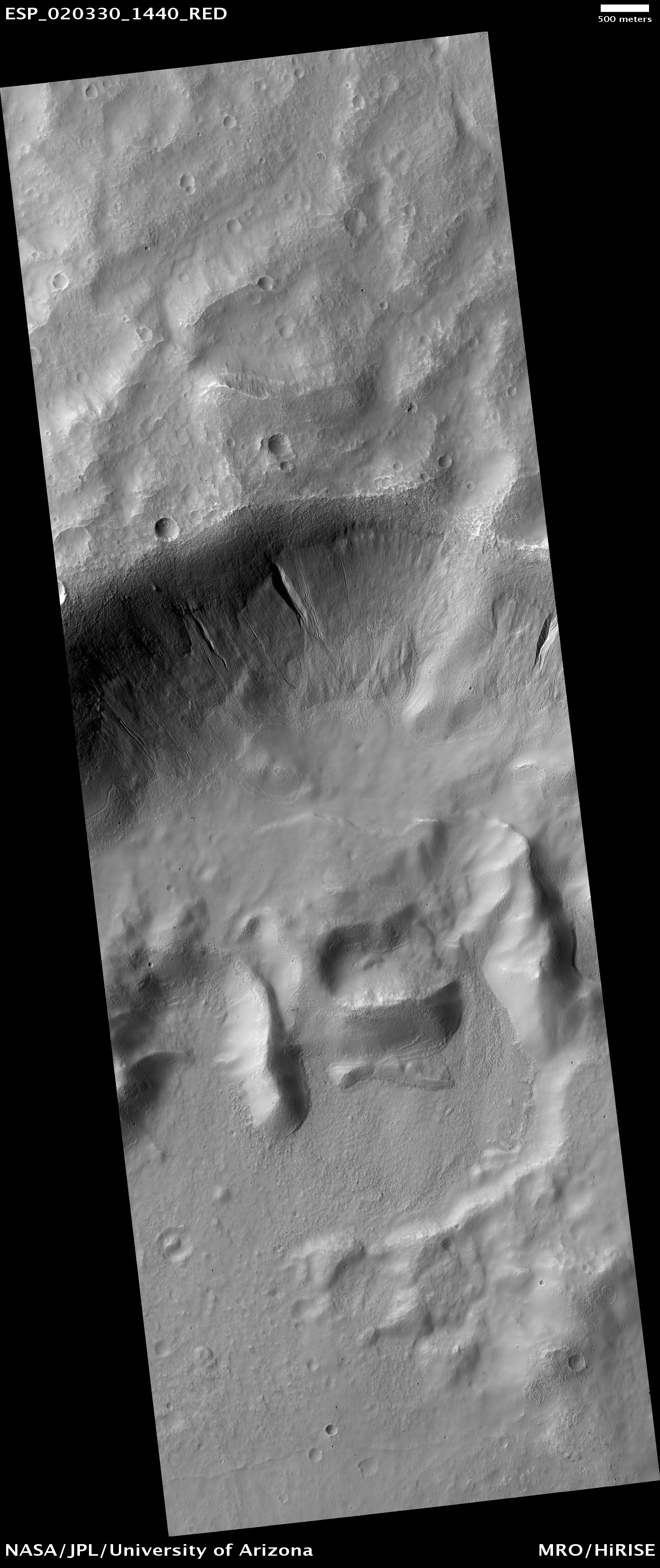
HiRISE image showing gullies. The scale bar is 500 meters. Picture taken under the HiWish program. Image from the Eridania quadrangle.

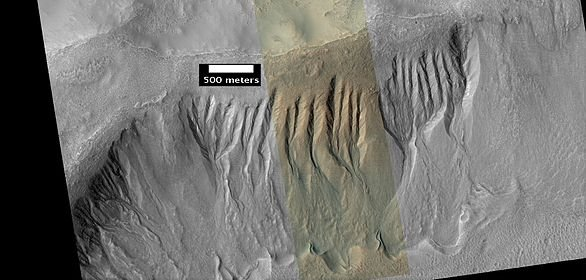
Gullies near Newton Crater, as seen by HiRISE under the HiWish Program.

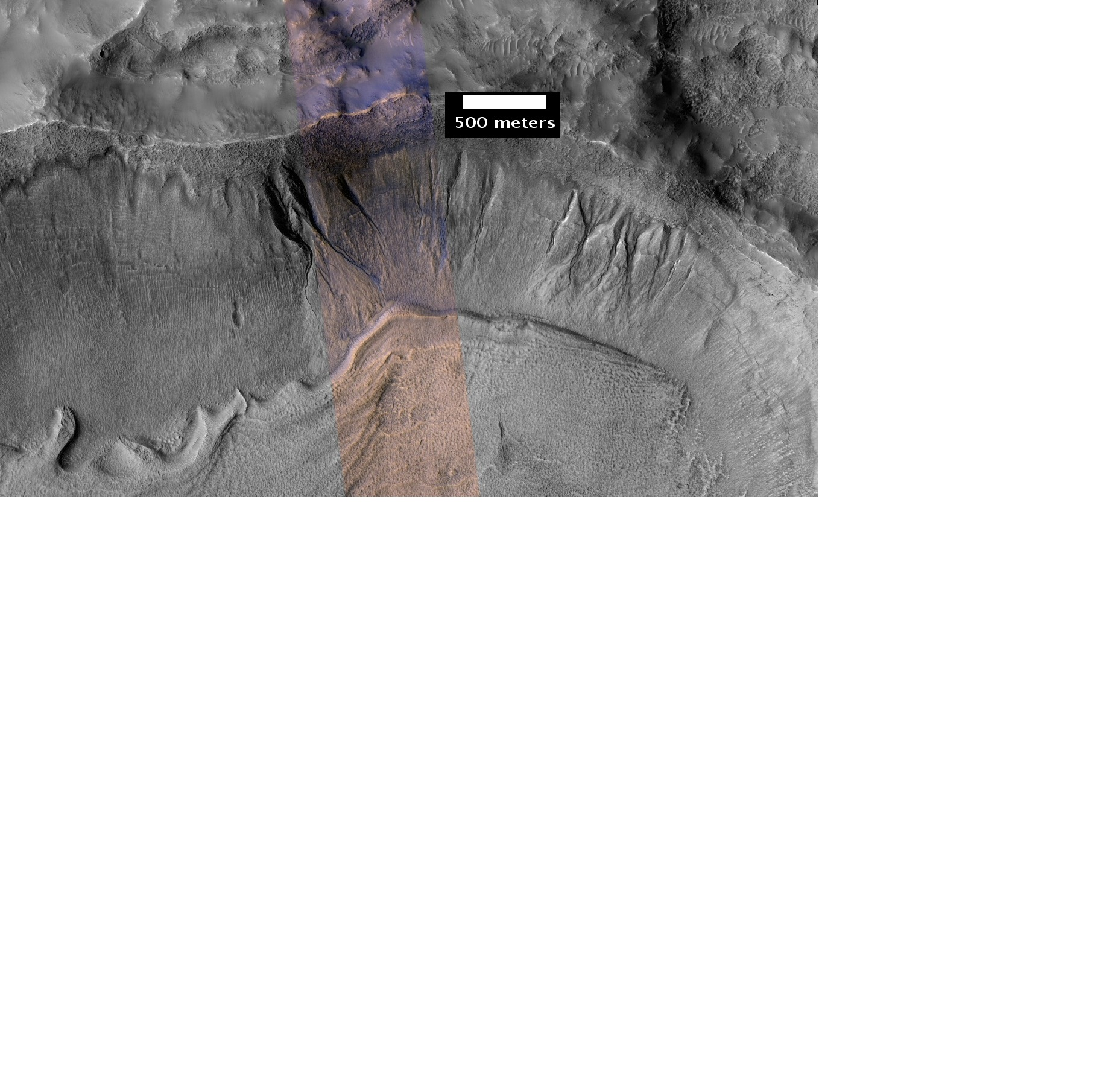
Gullies in a crater in Terra Sirenum, as seen by HiRISE under the HiWish Program.

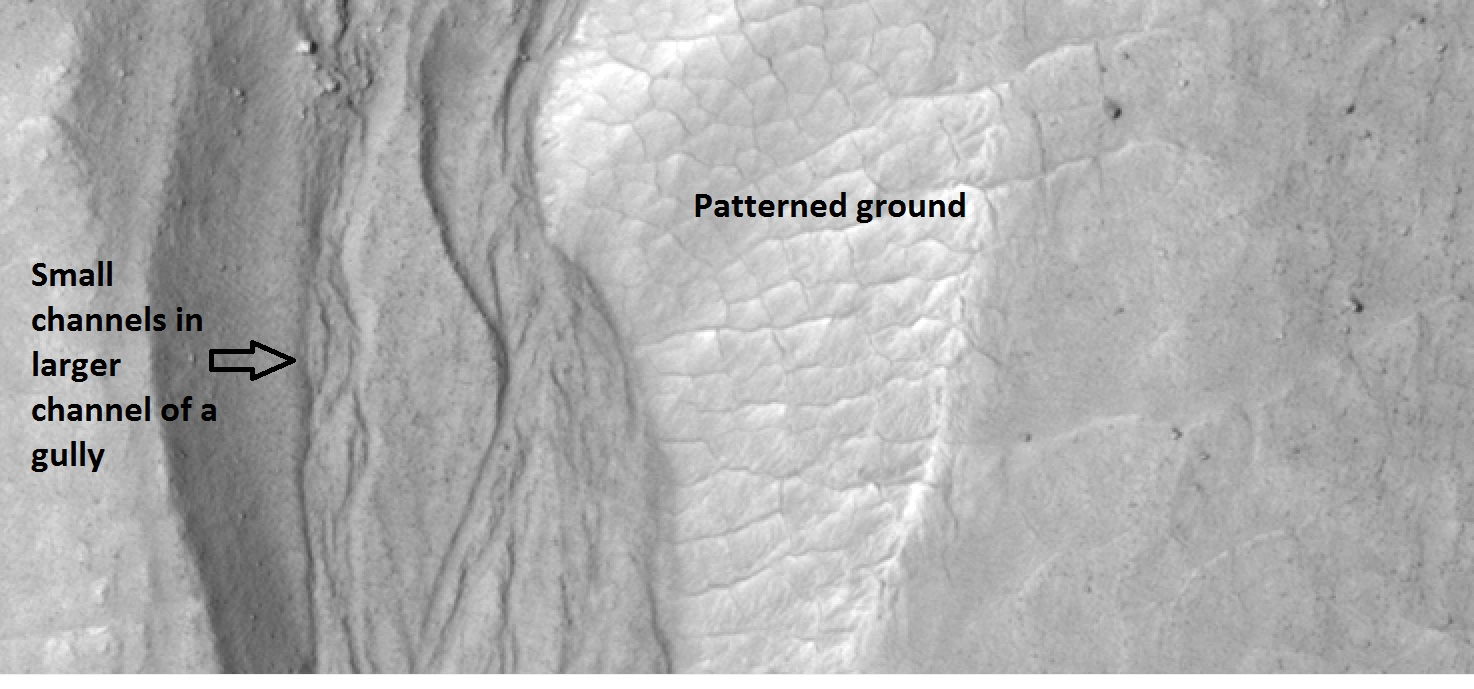
Close-up of gully showing multiple channels and patterned ground, as seen by HiRISE under the HiWish program.

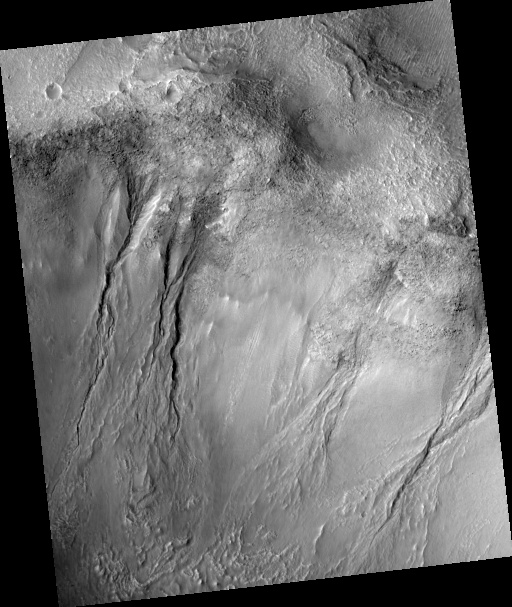
Group of gullies, as seen by HiRISE under the HiWish program. Location is Thaumasia quadrangle.

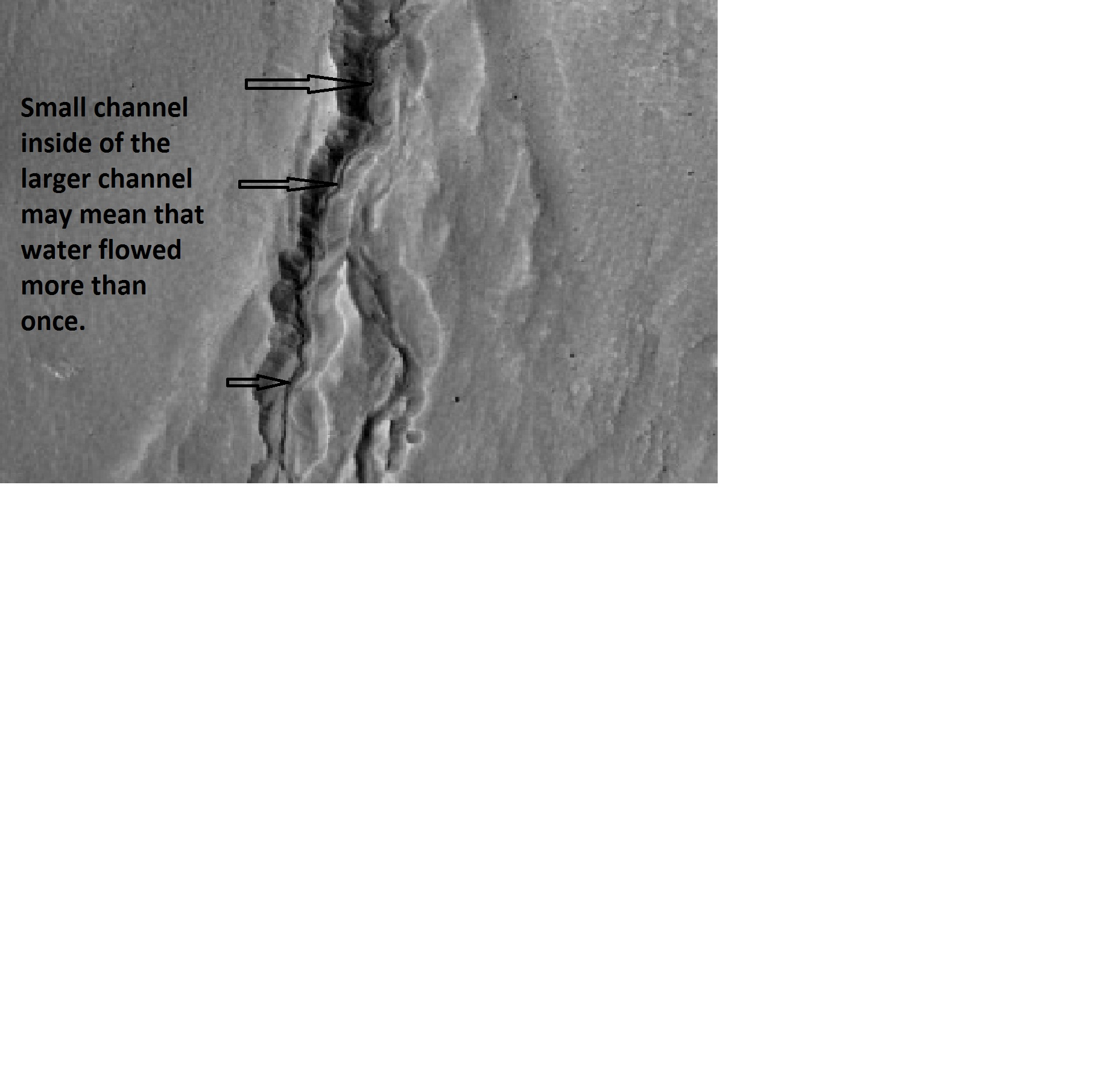
Enlargement of part of previous image showing smaller gullies inside larger ones. Water probably flowed in these gullies more than once. Location is Thaumasia quadrangle.

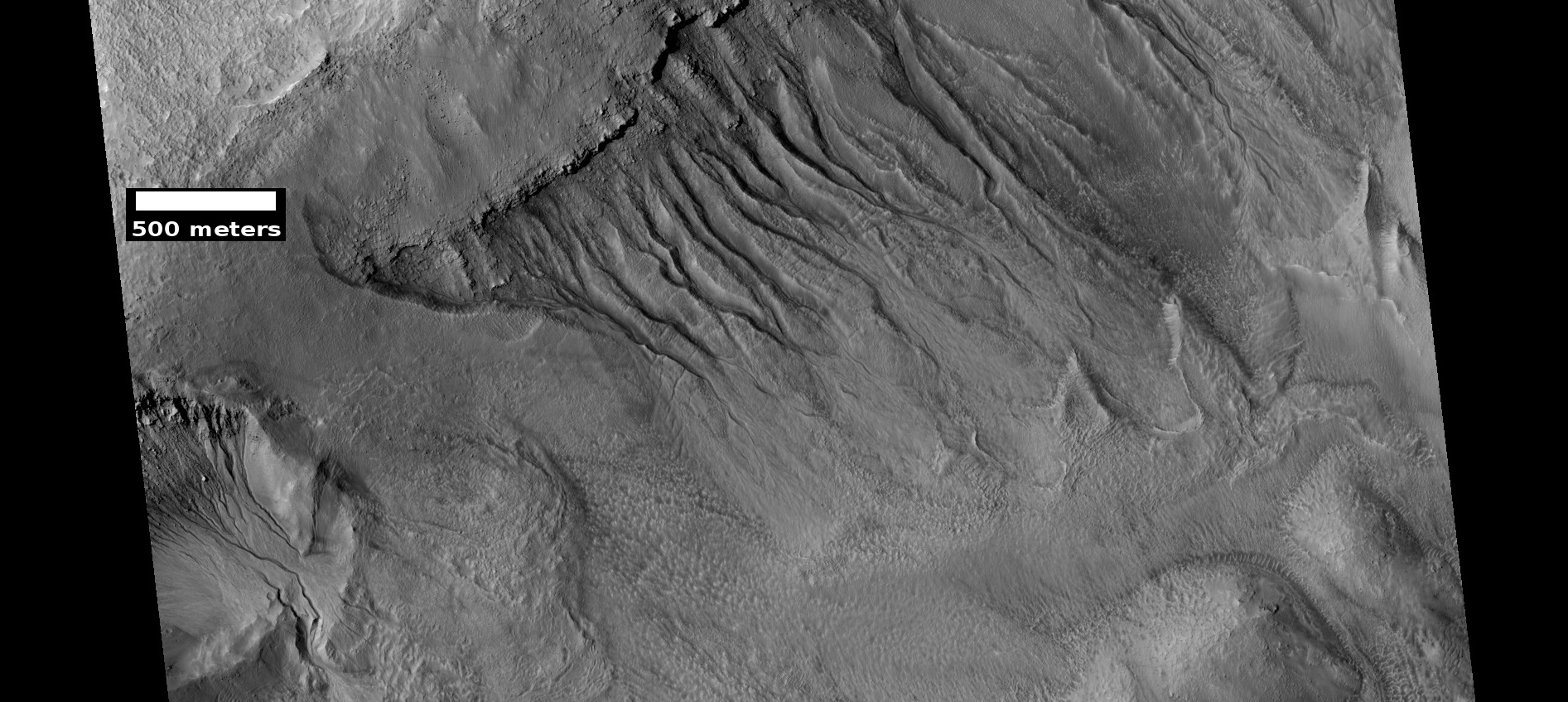
Gullies in crater, as seen by HiRISE under HiWish program. Location is Eridania quadrangle.

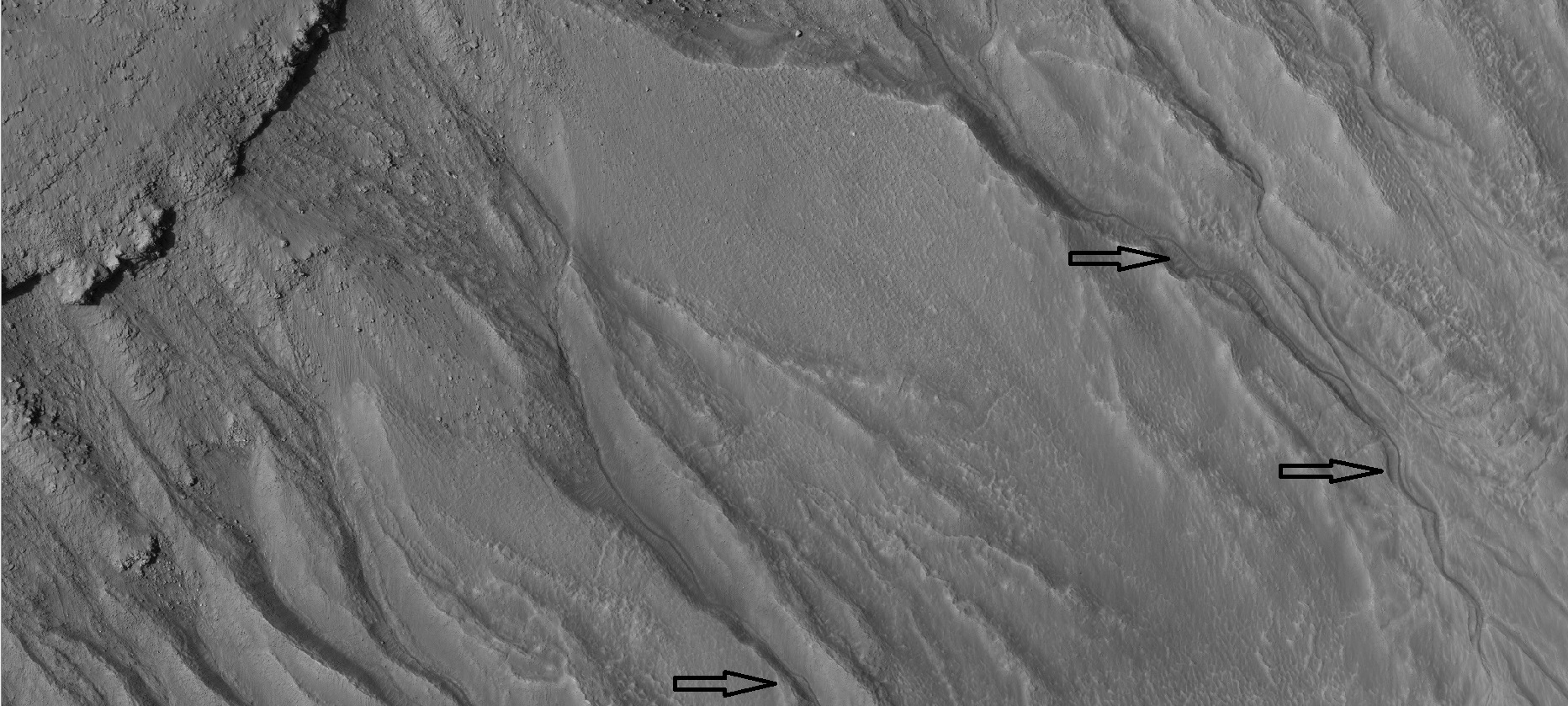
Close-up of gullies in crater showing channels within larger valleys and curves in channels. These characteristics suggest they were made by flowing water. Note: this is an enlargement of the previous image by HiRISE under HiWish program. Location is Eridania quadrangle.

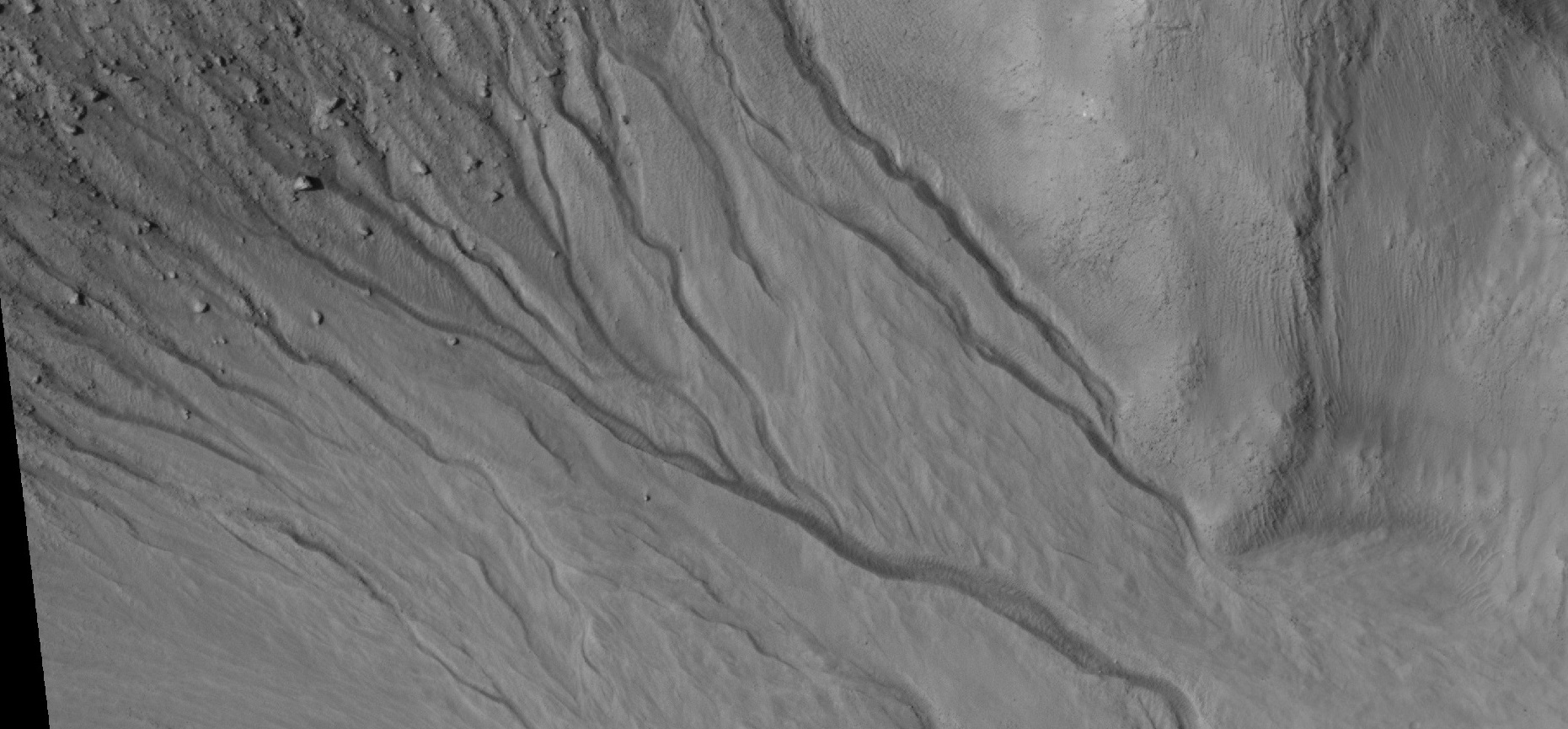
Close-up of gully network showing branched channels and curves; these characteristics suggest creation by a fluid. Note: this is an enlargement of a previous wide view of gullies in a crater, as seen by HiRISE under HiWish program. Location is Eridania quadrangle.

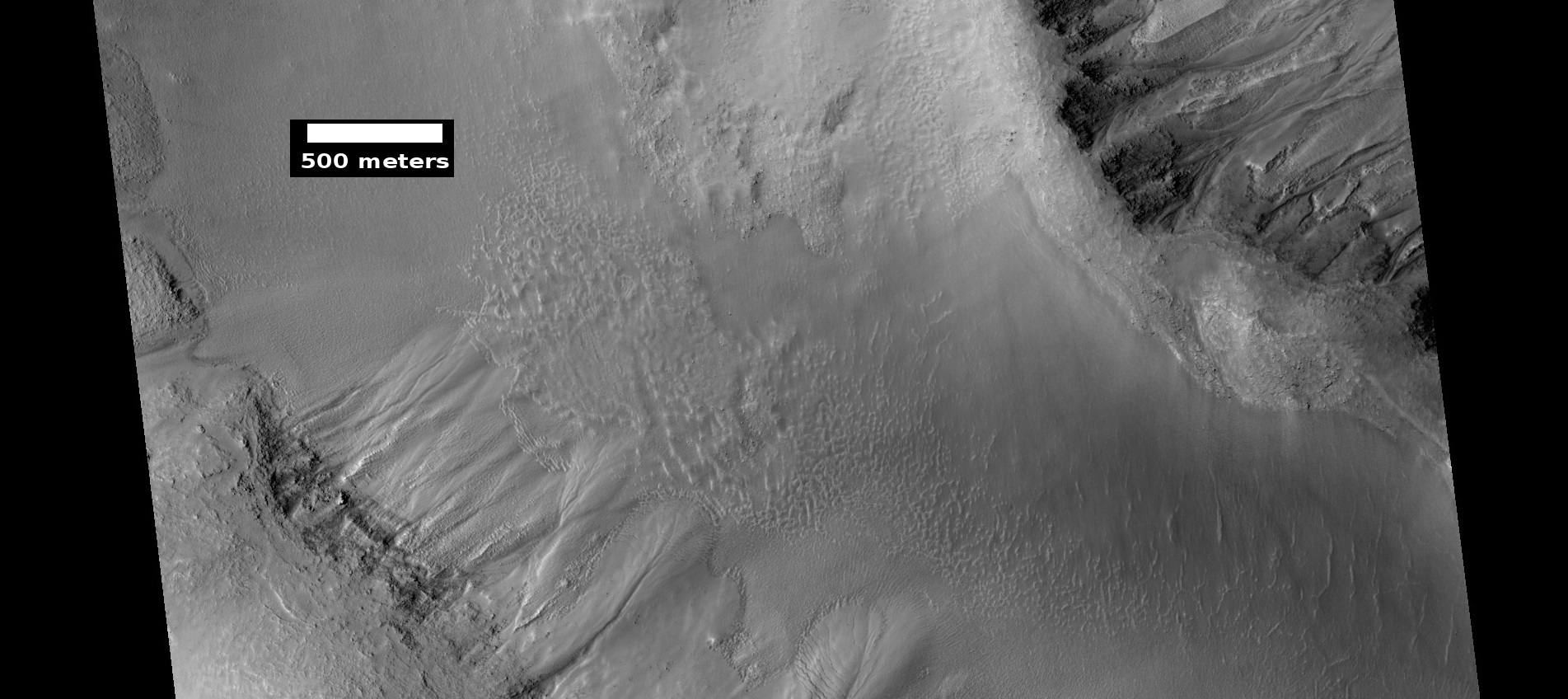
Gullies in two levels of a crater wall, as seen by HiRISE under HiWish program. Gullies at two levels suggests they were not made with an aquifer, as was first suggested. Location is Phaethontis quadrangle.

Lohse Crater Gullies on Central Peak. Image located in Argyre quadrangle. Having gullies on a central peak runs counter to the idea that they were formed by an aquifer, as was first suggested.

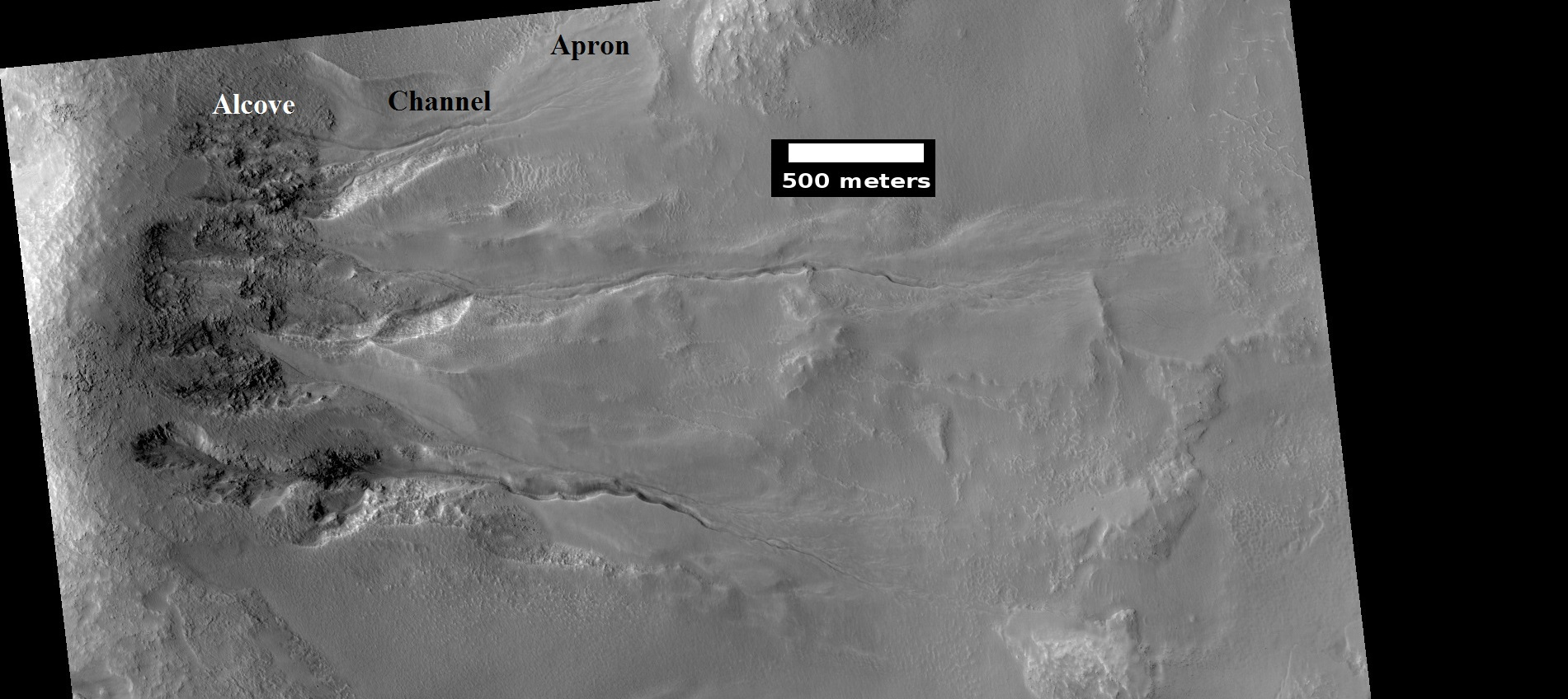
Image of gullies with main parts labeled. The main parts of a Martian gully are alcove, channel, and apron. Since there are no craters on this gully, it is thought to be rather young. Picture was taken by HiRISE under HiWish program. Location is Phaethontis quadrangle.

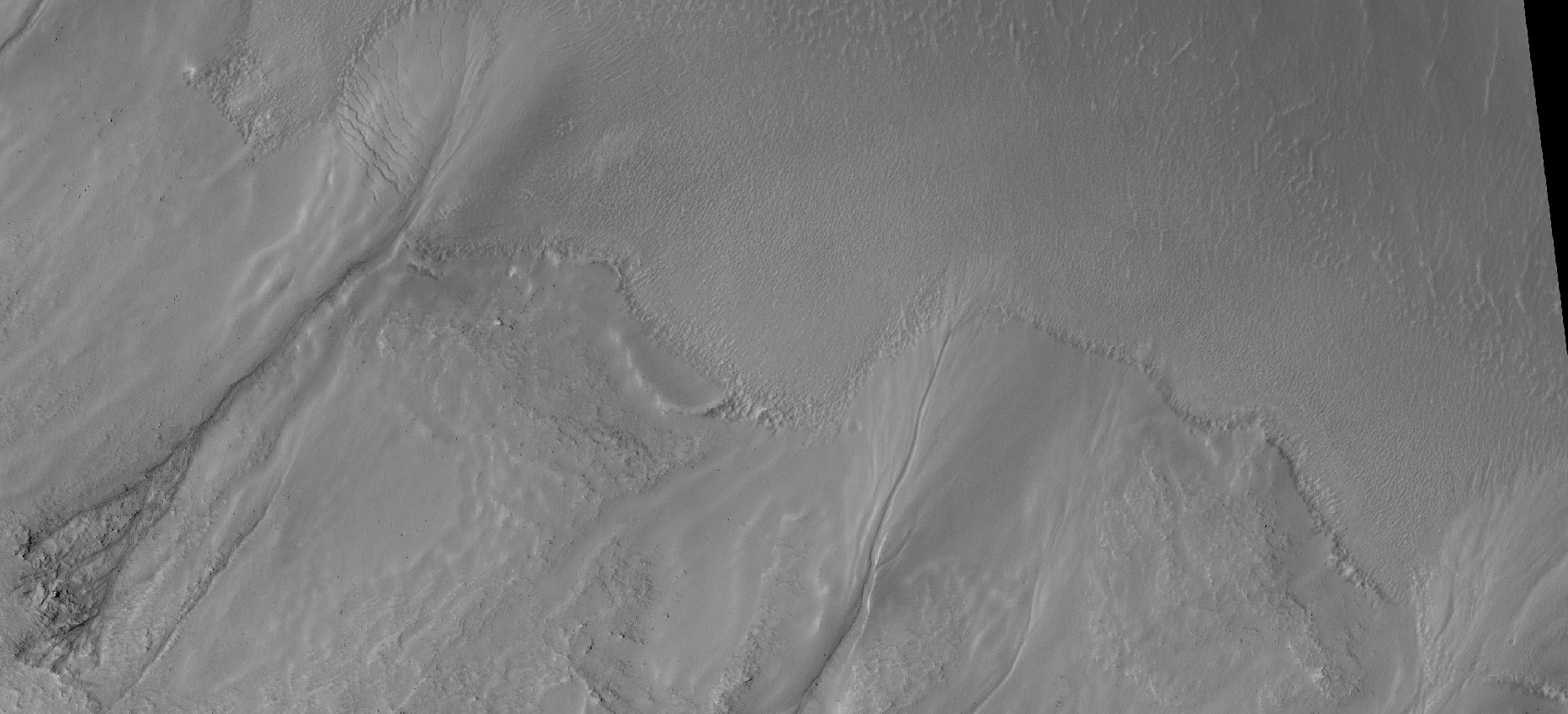
Close-up of gully aprons showing they are free of craters; hence very young. Location is Phaethontis quadrangle. Picture was taken by HiRISE under HiWish program.

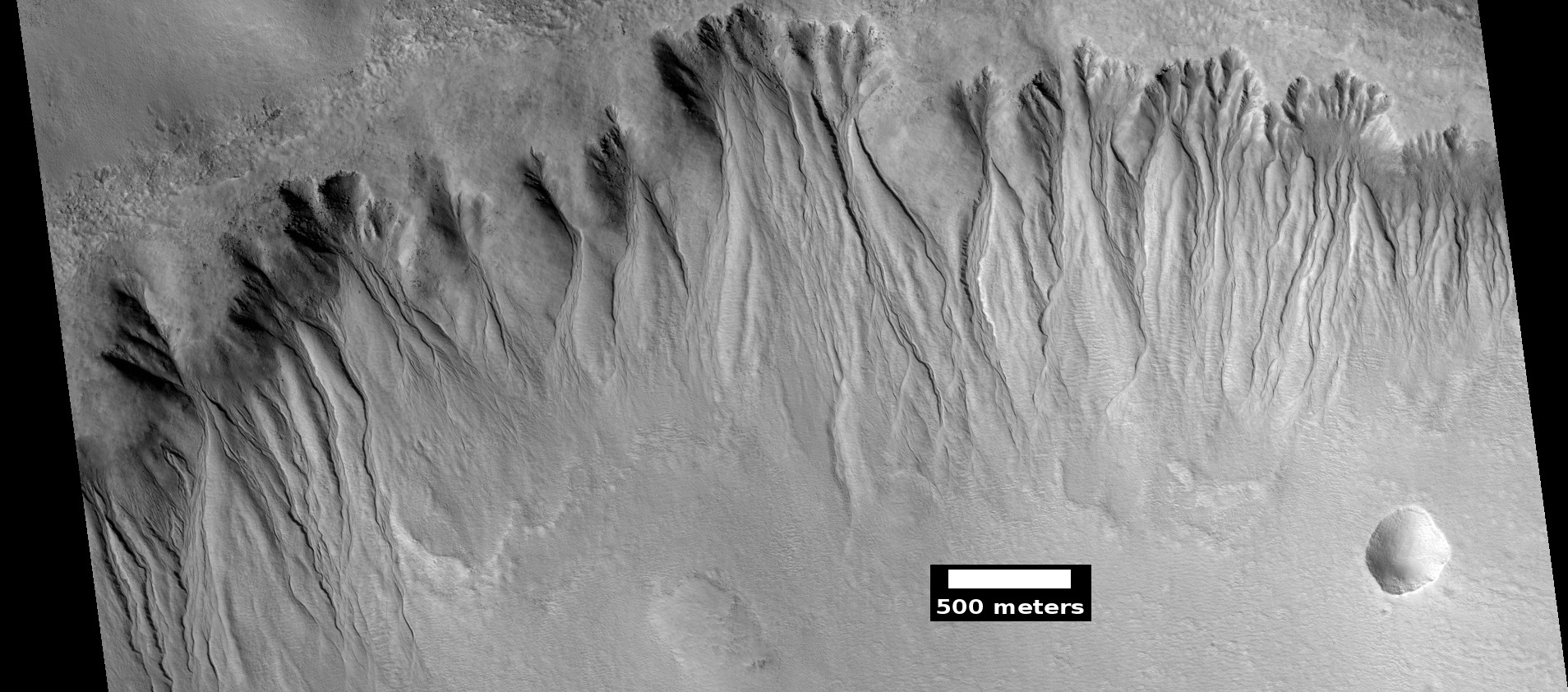
Gullies on wall of crater, as seen by HiRISE under HiWish program Location is the Mare Acidalium quadrangle.

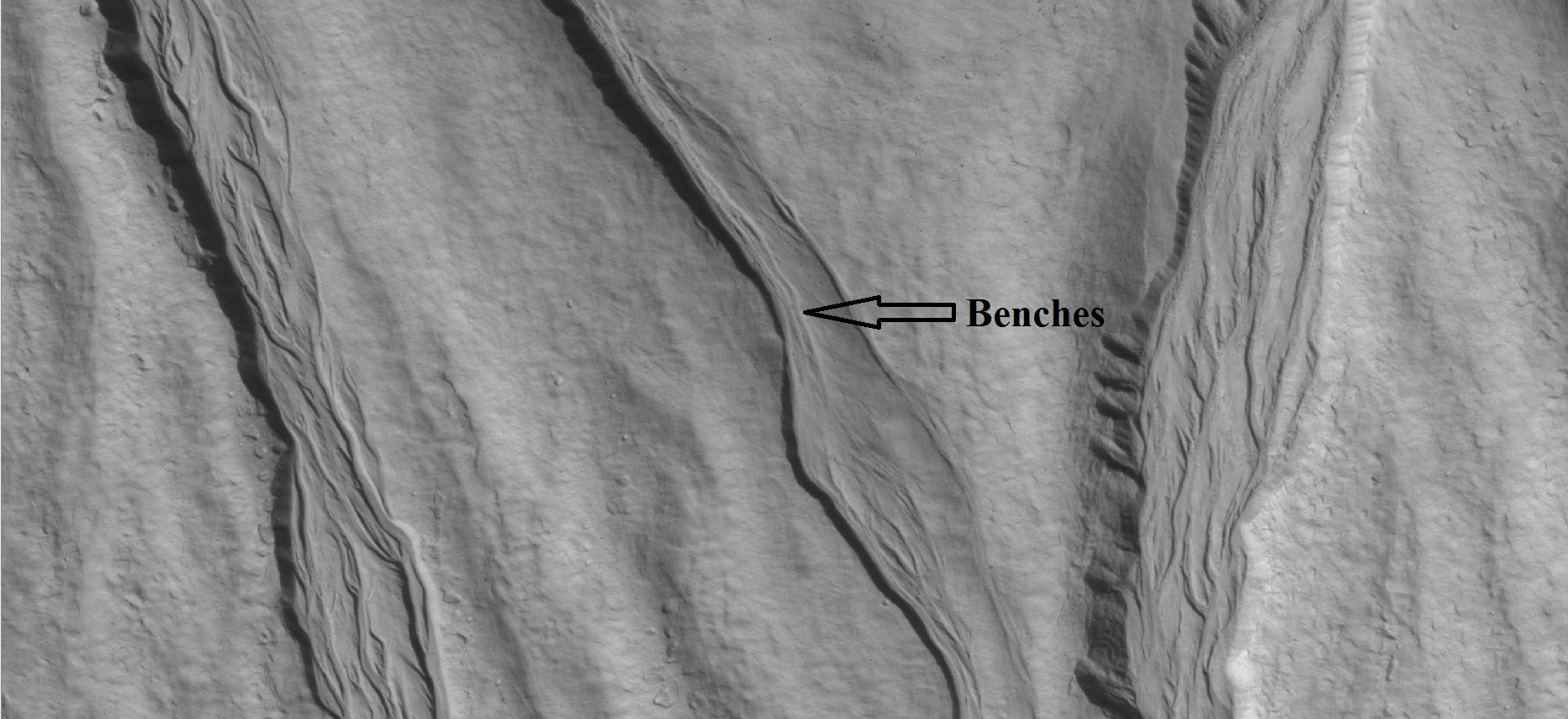
Close-up of gully channels, as seen by HiRISE under HiWish program. This image shows many streamlined forms and some benches along a channel. These features suggest formation by running water. Benches are usually formed when the water level goes down a bit and stays at that level for a time. Picture was taken with HiRISE under HiWish program. Location is the Mare Acidalium quadrangle. Note this is an enlargement of a previous image.

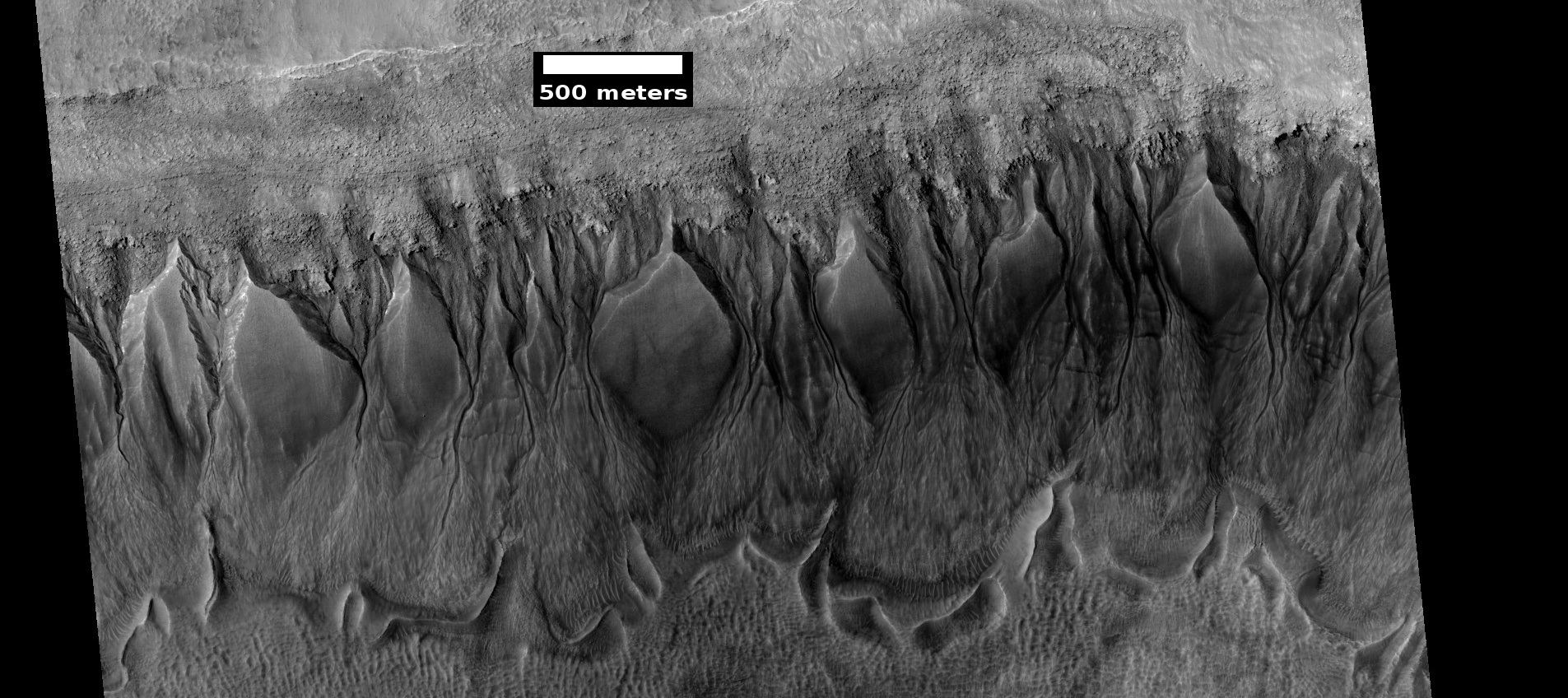
Gullies in crater in Phaethontis quadrangle, as seen by HiRISE under HiWish program

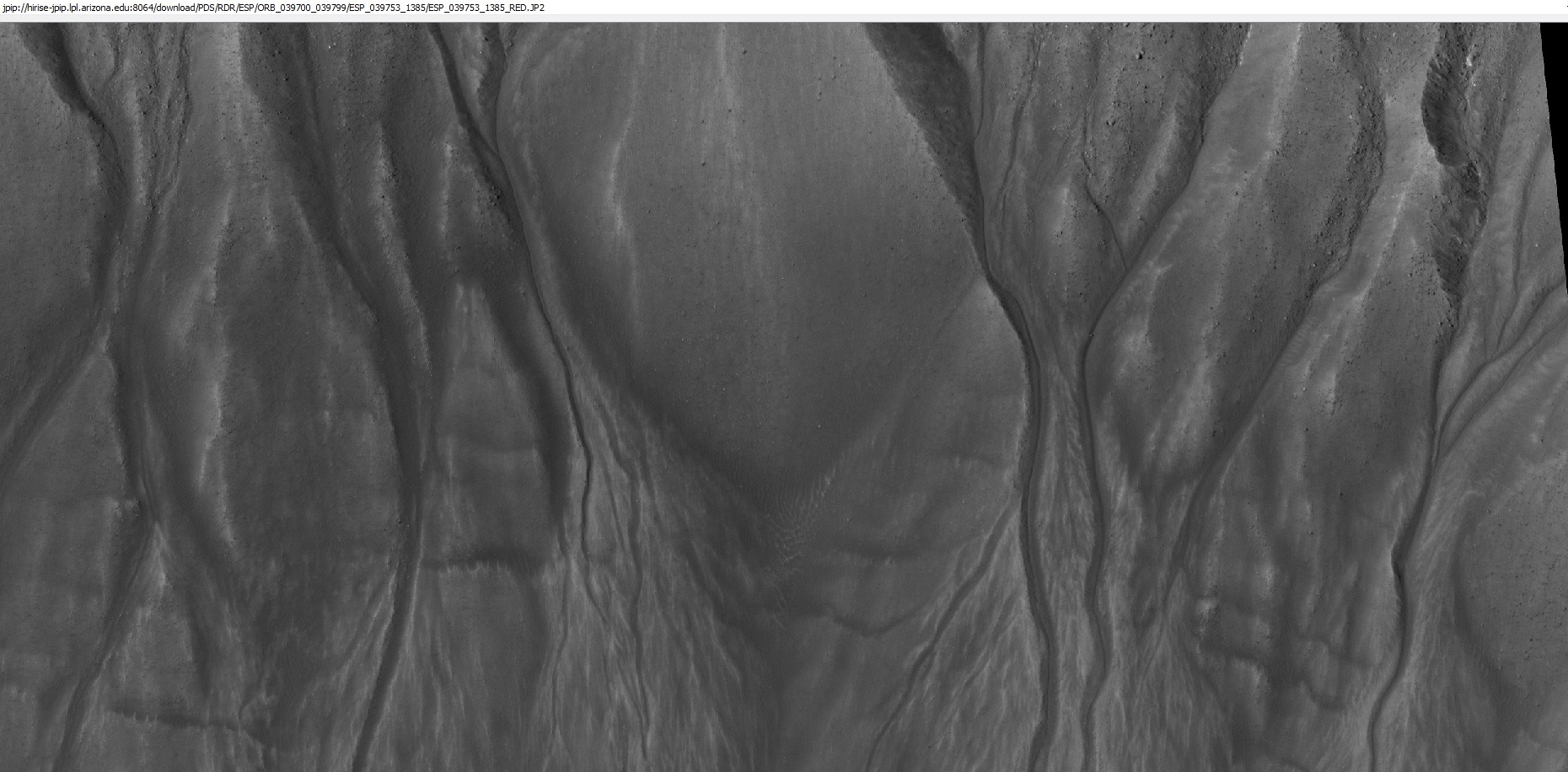
Close-up of channels in gullies showing that the paths of the channels changed over time. This feature suggest formation by running water with a high load of sediment. Picture was taken with HiRISE under HiWish program. Location is the Mare Acidalium quadrangle. Note this is an enlargement of a previous image in Phaethontis quadrangle.

== Glaciers ==
Glaciers, loosely defined as patches of currently or recently flowing ice, are thought to be present across large but restricted areas of the modern Martian surface, and are inferred to have been more widely distributed at times in the past. Lobate convex features on the surface known as viscous flow features and lobate debris aprons, which show the characteristics of non-Newtonian flow, are now almost unanimously regarded as true glaciers. However, a variety of other features on the surface have also been interpreted as directly linked to flowing ice, such as fretted terrain, lineated valley fill, concentric crater fill, and arcuate ridges. A variety of surface textures seen in imagery of the midlatitudes and polar regions are also thought to be linked to sublimation of glacial ice.

Radar from the Mars Reconnaissance Orbiter gave a strong reflection from the top and base of LDAs, meaning that pure water ice made up the bulk of the formation (between the two reflections). Because the surfaces of lobate debris flows, concentric crater fill, and lineated valley flows look similar, its assumed that all may contain water ice under a relatively thin layer of insulating debris.

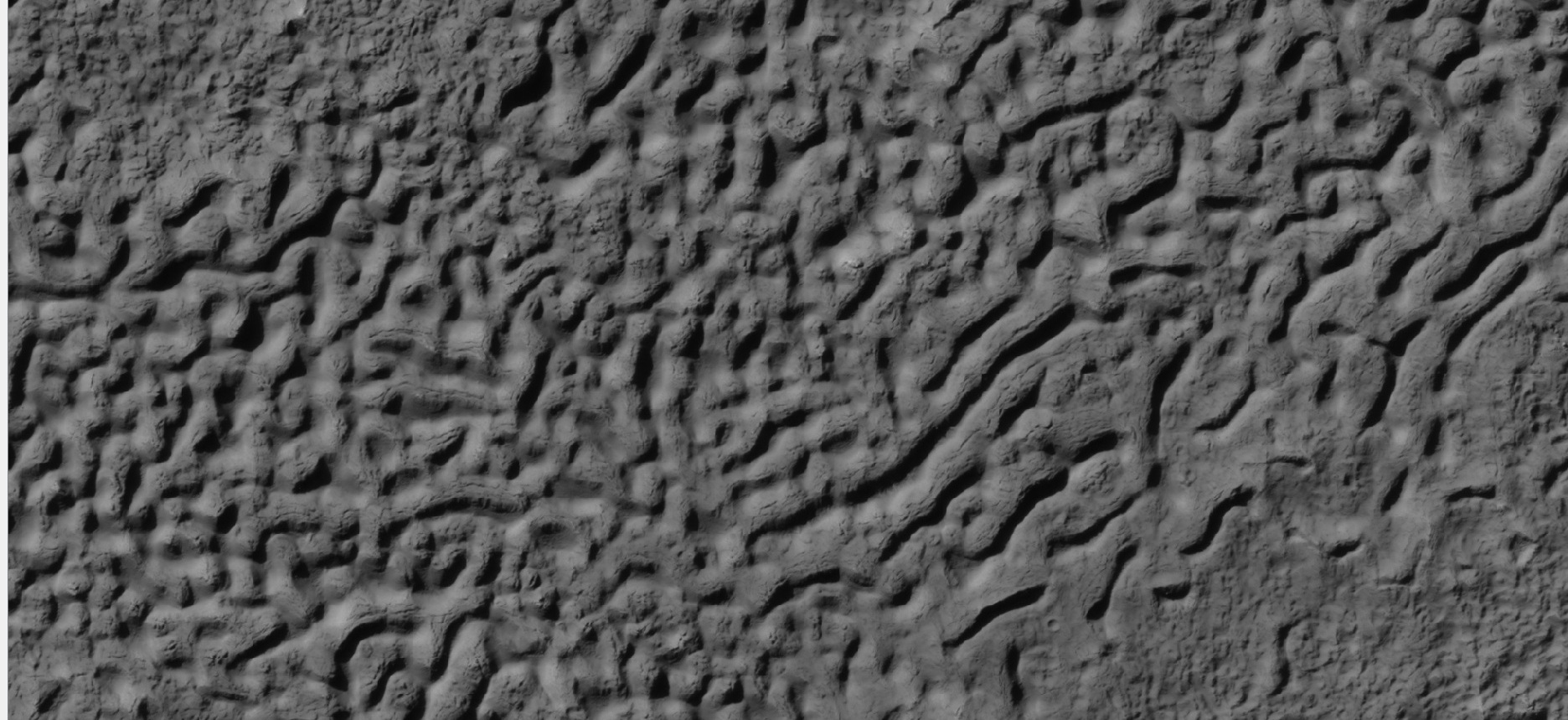
Closed-cell brain terrain, as seen by HiRISE under the HiWish program. This type of surface is common on lobate debris aprons, concentric crater fill, and lineated valley fill.

The possibility of water ice in LDAs and other glacial features demonstrates that water is found at even lower latitudes. Future colonists on Mars will be able to tap into these ice deposits, instead of having to travel to much higher latitudes. Another major advantage of these glacial landscapes over other sources of Martian water is that they can easily detected and mapped from orbit. Lobate debris aprons are shown below from the Phlegra Montes, which are at latitude of 38.2 degrees north, so the discovery of water ice in LDAs greatly expands the range of easily available on Mars. It is far easier to land a spaceship near the equator of Mars, so the closer water is available to the equator the better it will be for future colonists.

Lobate debris aprons

Of interest from the days of the Viking Orbiters are piles of material surrounding cliffs; they are now called lobate debris aprons (LDAs). These features have a convex topography and a gentle slope from cliffs or escarpments; this suggests flow away from the steep source cliff. In addition, lobate debris aprons can show surface lineations just as rock glaciers on the Earth.

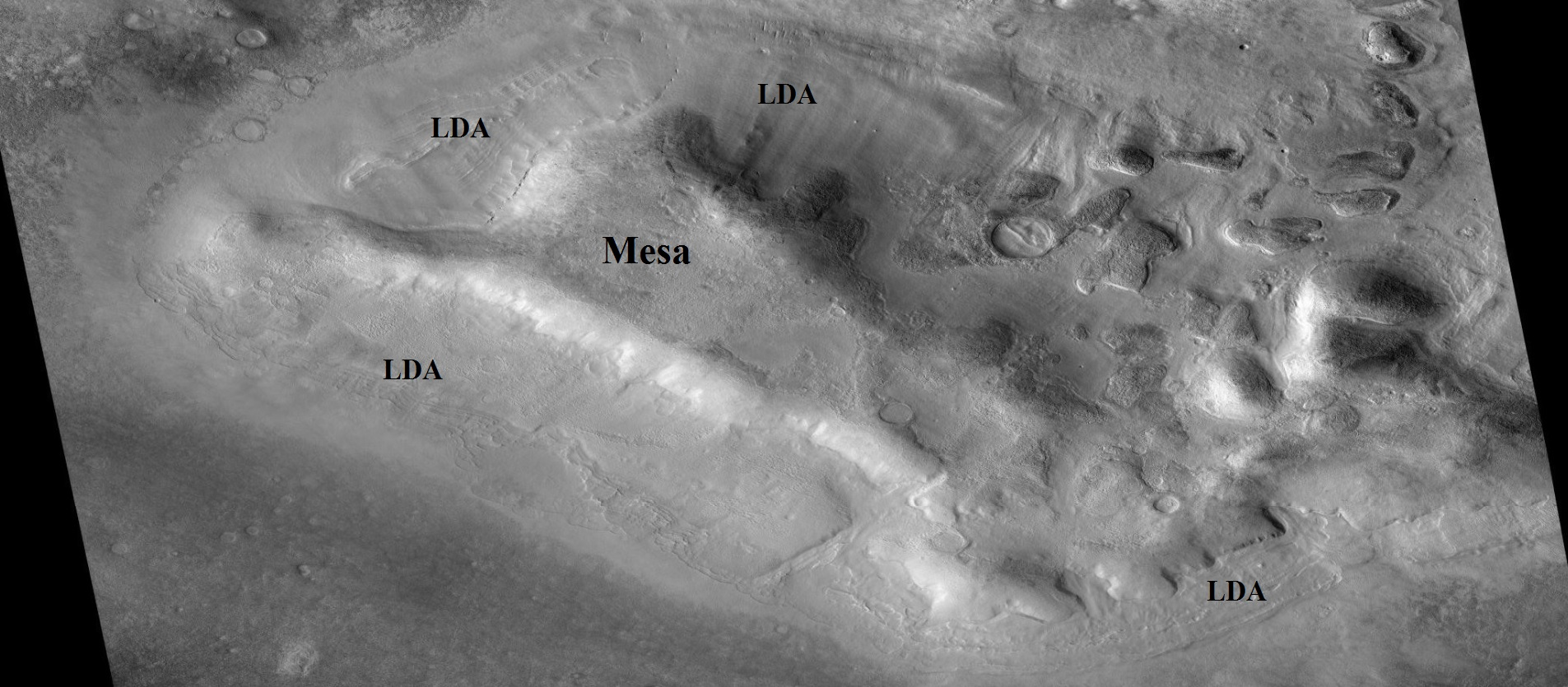
lobate debris aprons (LDAs) around a mesa, as seen by CTX Mesa and LDAs are labeled so one can see their relationship. Radar studies have determined that LDAs contain ice; therefore these can be important for future colonists of Mars. Location is Ismenius Lacus quadrangle.

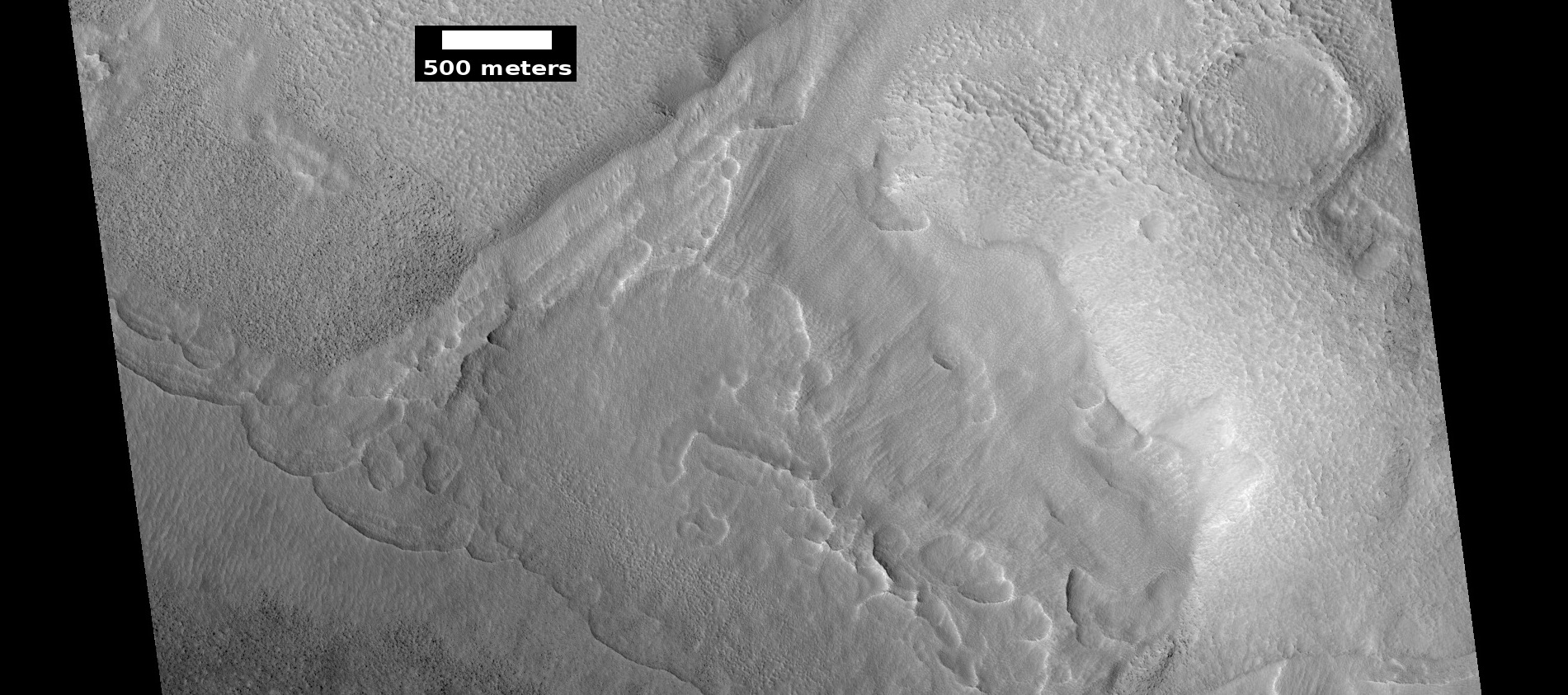
Close-up of lobate debris apron (LDA), as seen by HiRISE under HiWish program

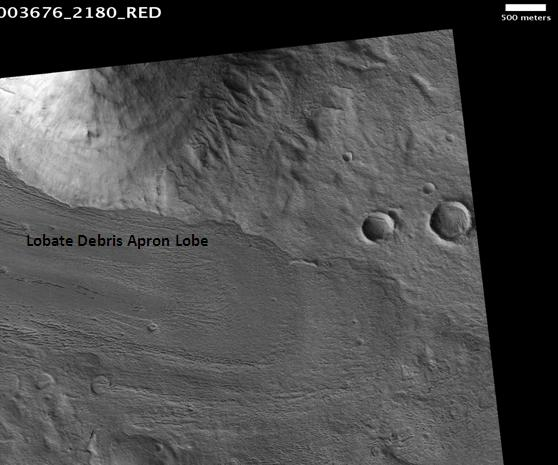
Lobate debris apron in Phlegra Montes, Cebrenia quadrangle. The debris apron is probably mostly ice with a thin covering of rock debris, so it could be a source of water for future Martian colonists. Scale bar is 500 meters long.

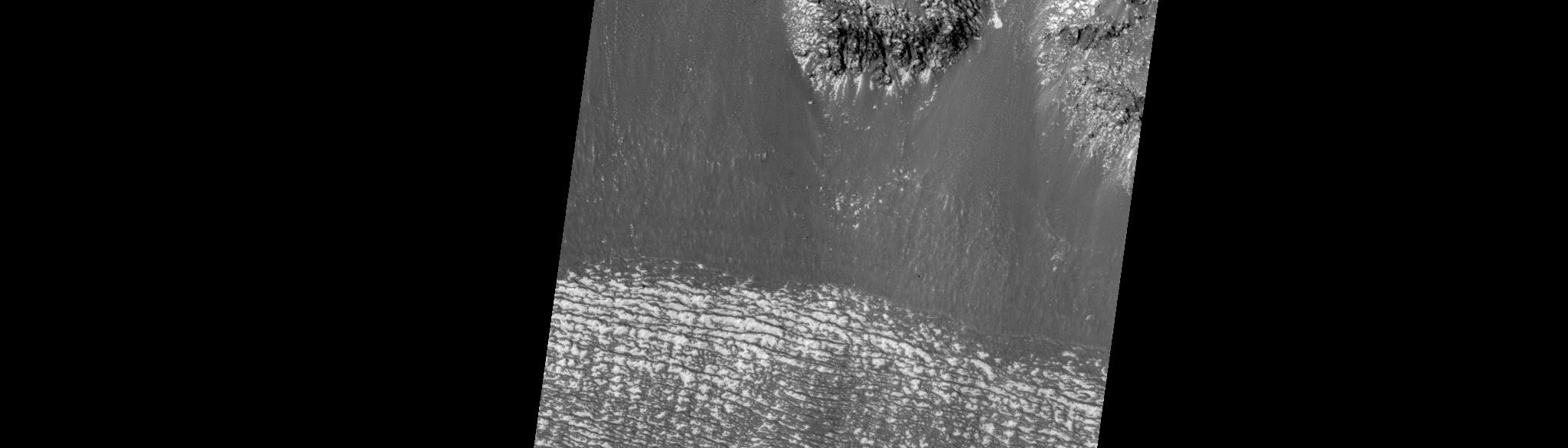
Close-up of surface of a lobate debris apron. Note the lines that are common in rock glaciers on the Earth. Image located in Hellas quadrangle.

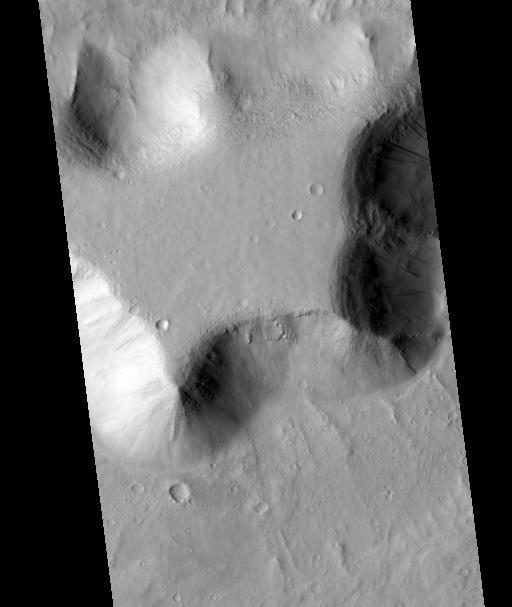
View of lobate debris apron along a slope. Image located in Arcadia quadrangle.

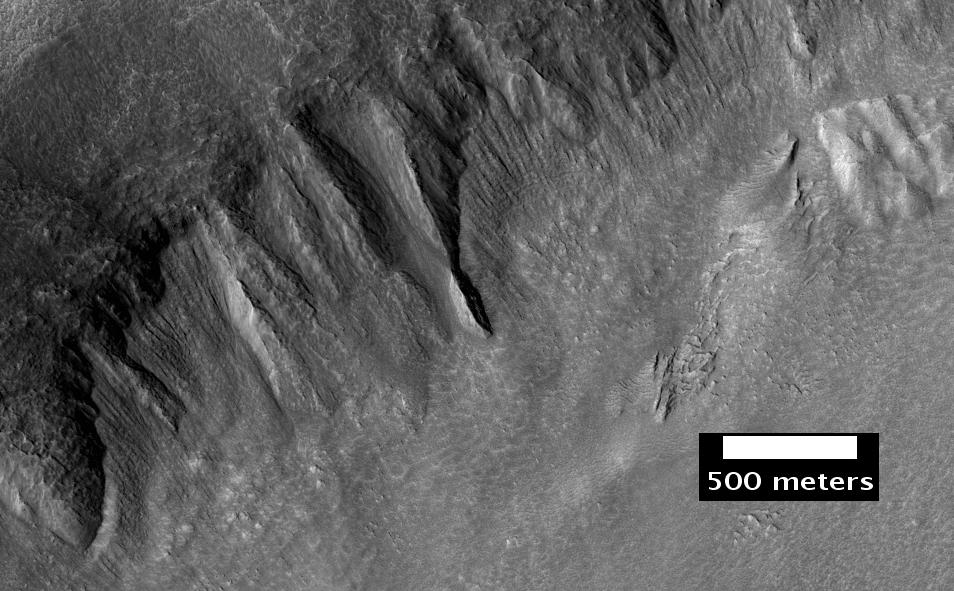
Place where a lobate debris apron begins. Note stripes which indicate movement. Image located in Ismenius Lacus quadrangle.

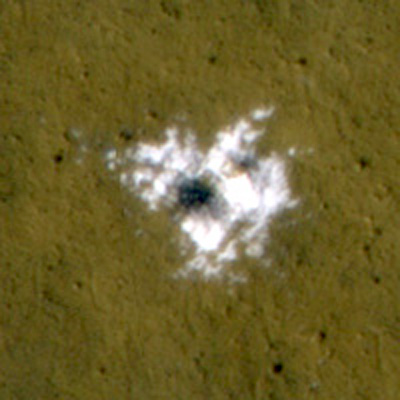
Bright part is water ice that has been exposed by impact. The ice was identified using CRISM on the MRO. Location is Cebrenia quadrangle.

Lineated valley fill

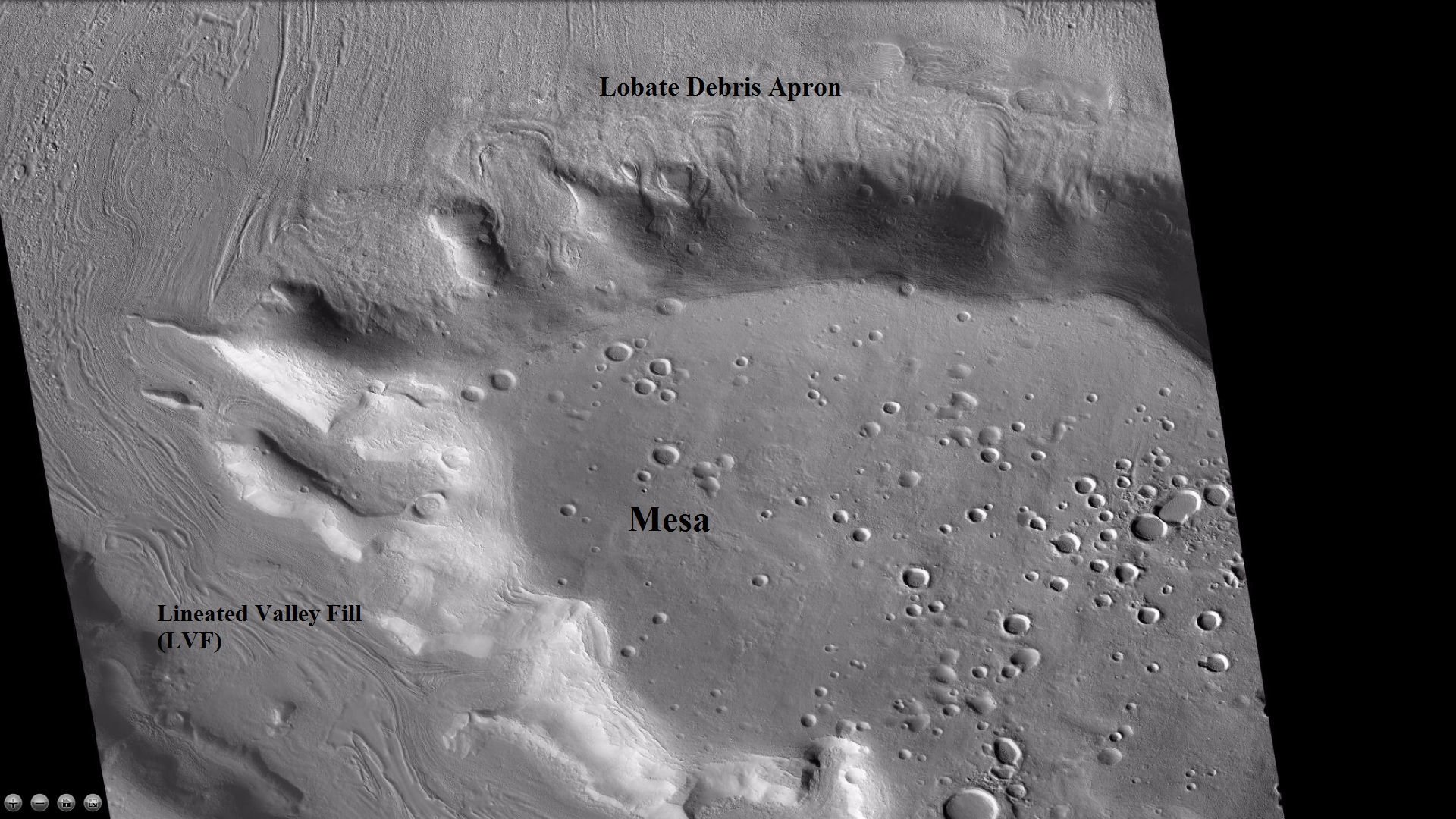
Wide CTX view of mesa showing lobate debris apron (LDA) and lineated valley fill. Both are thought to be debris-covered glaciers. Location is Ismenius Lacus quadrangle.

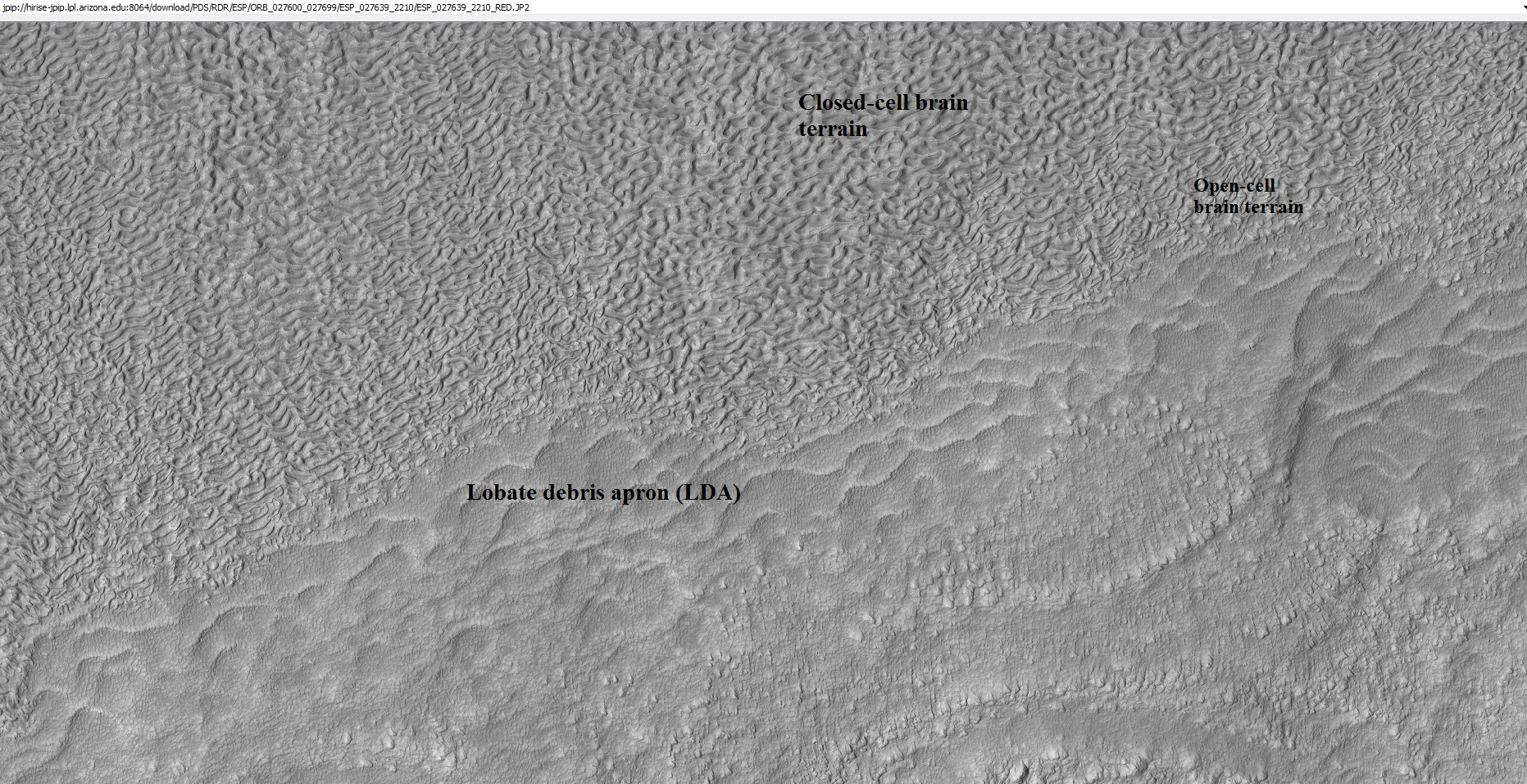
Close-up of lobate debris apron from the previous CTX image of a mesa. Image shows open-cell brain terrain and closed-cell brain terrain, which is more common. Open-cell brain terrain is thought to hold a core of ice. Image is from HiRISE under HiWish program.

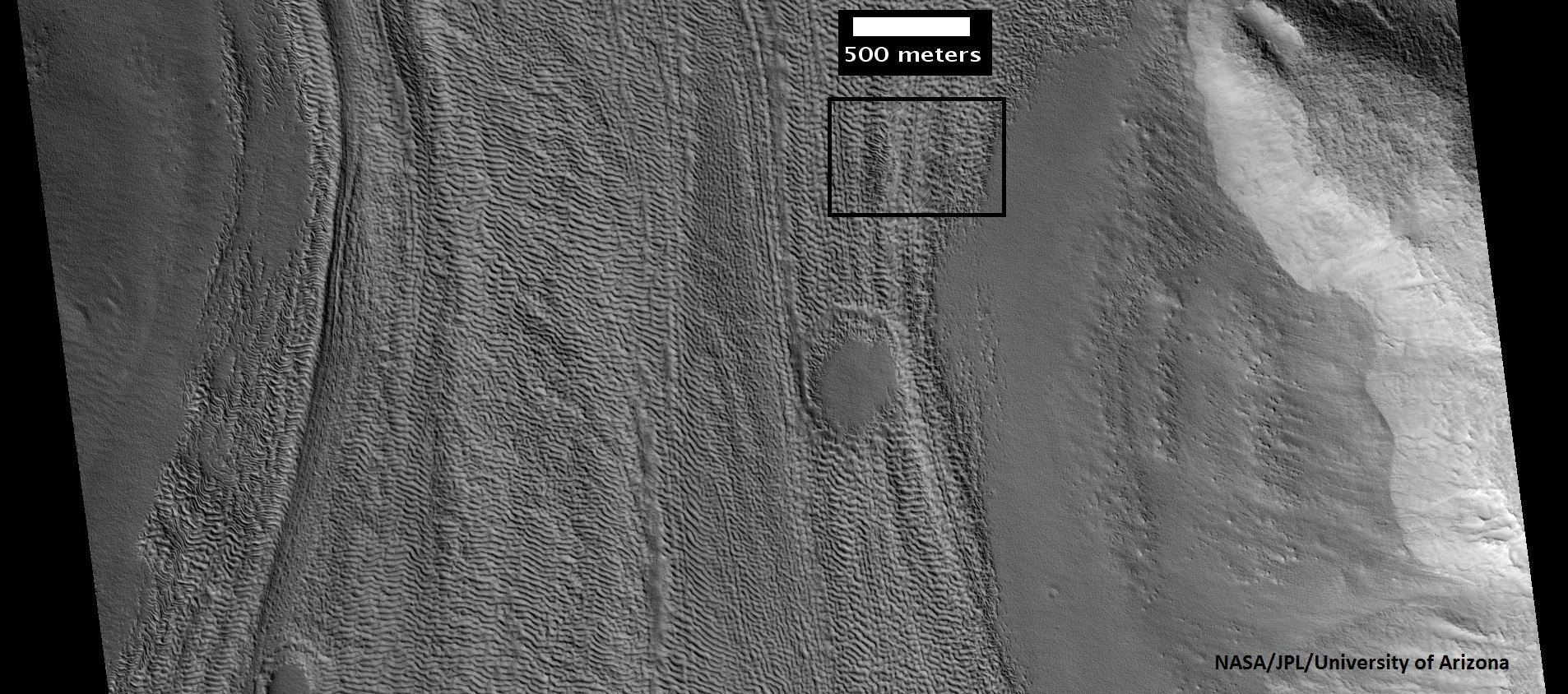
Context picture showing origin of next picture. The location is a region of lineated valley fill. Image from HiRISE under HiWish program.

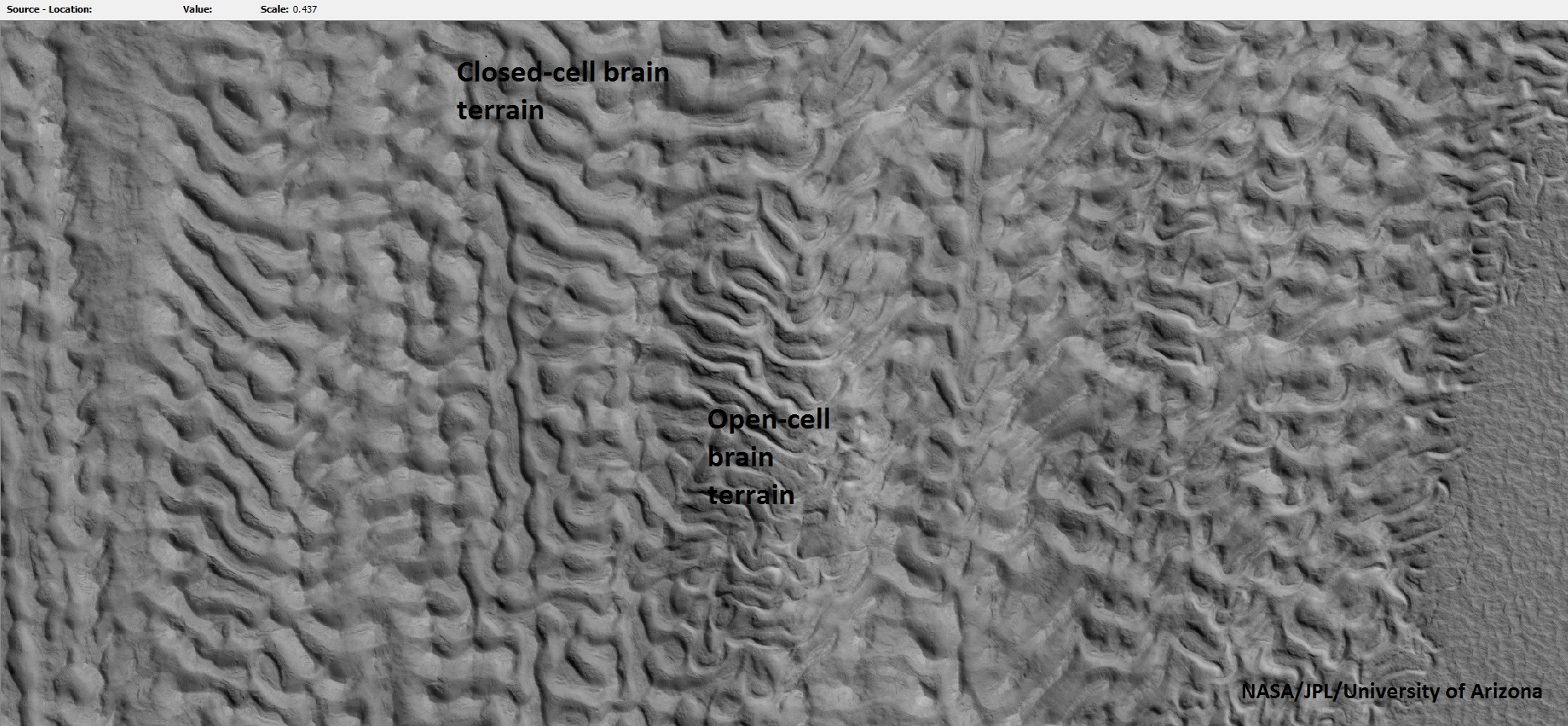
Open- and closed-cell brain terrain, as seen by HiRISE, under HiWish program.

Concentric crater fill

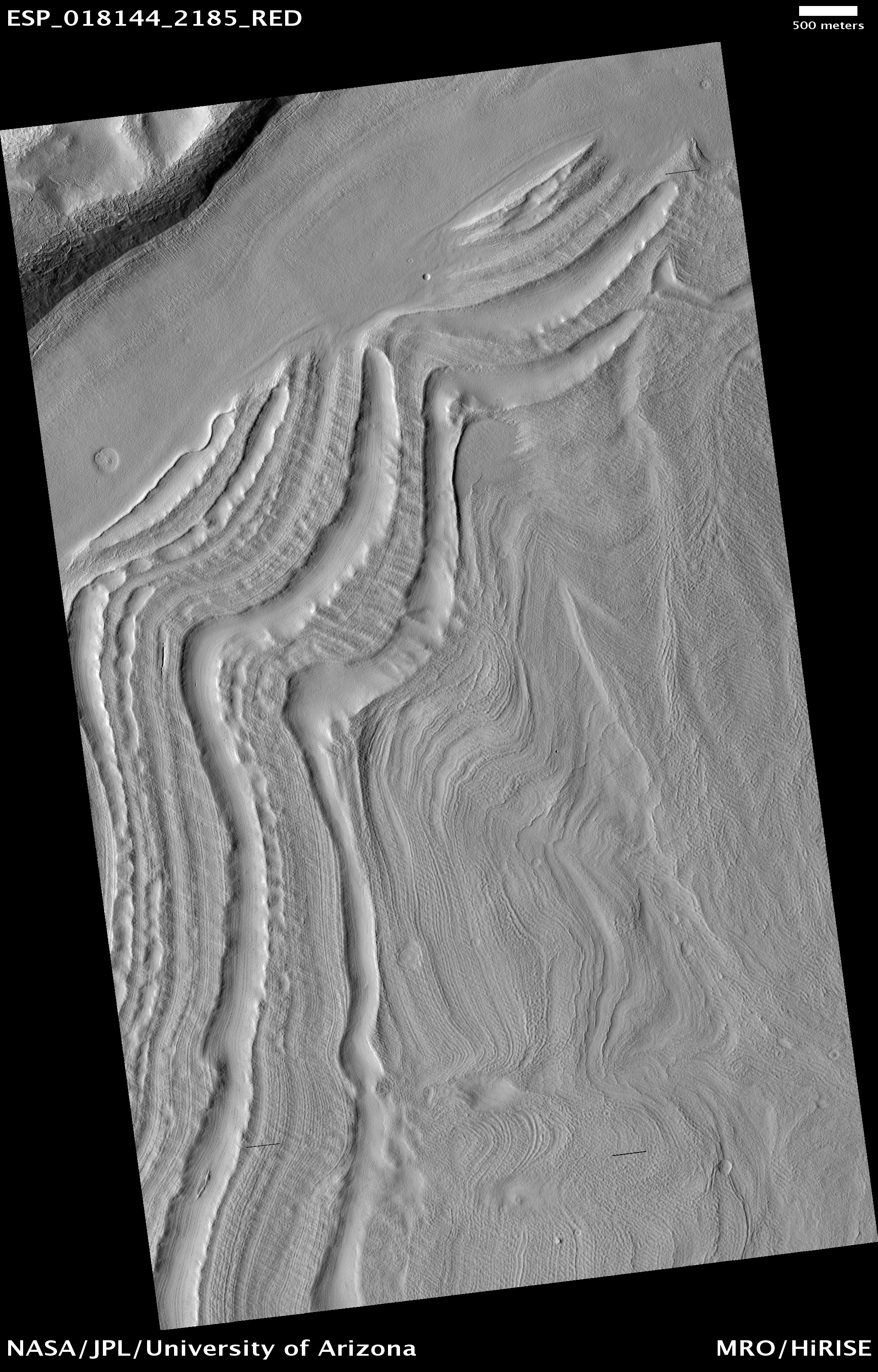
Well-developed hollows, as seen by HiRISE under the HiWish program. Hollows are on floor of a crater with concentric crater fill. Location is Casius quadrangle.

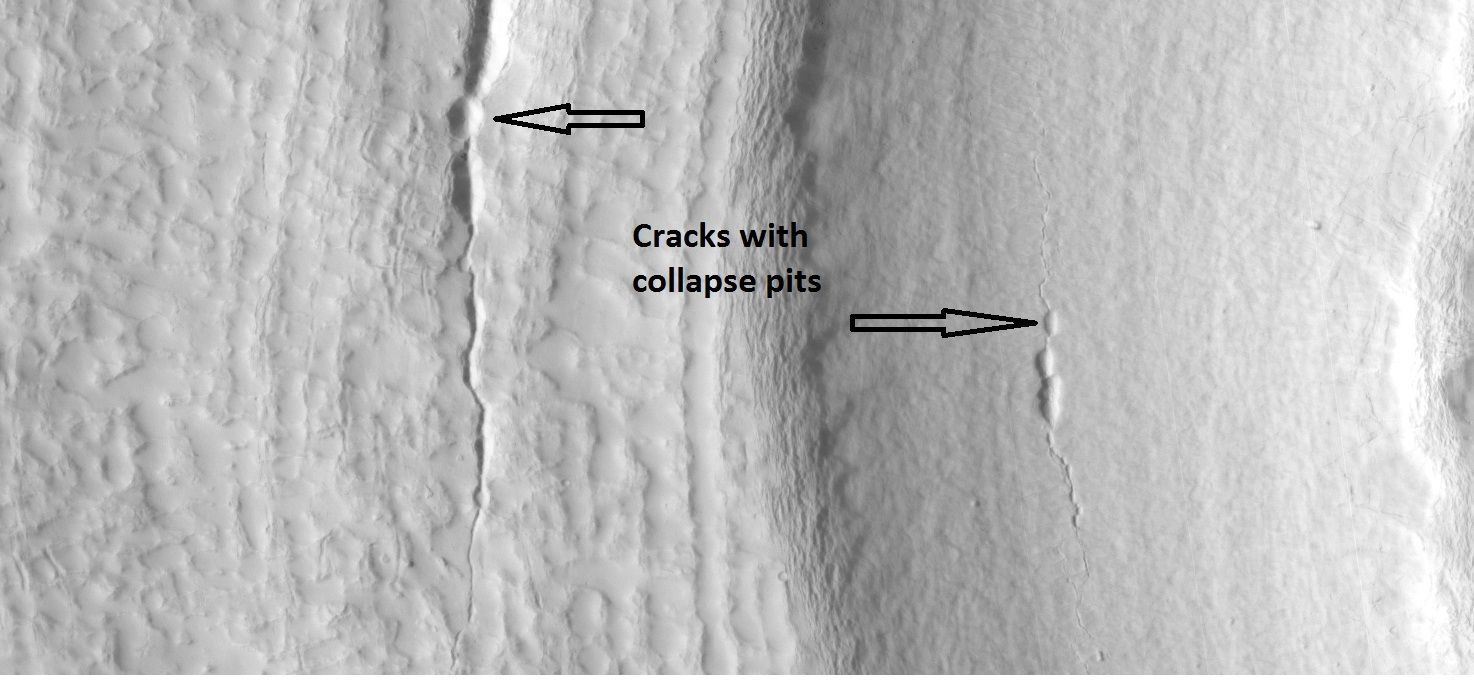
Close-up that shows cracks containing pits on the floor of a crater containing concentric crater fill, as seen by HiRISE under HiWish program. Location is Casius quadrangle.

Tongue-shaped glaciers

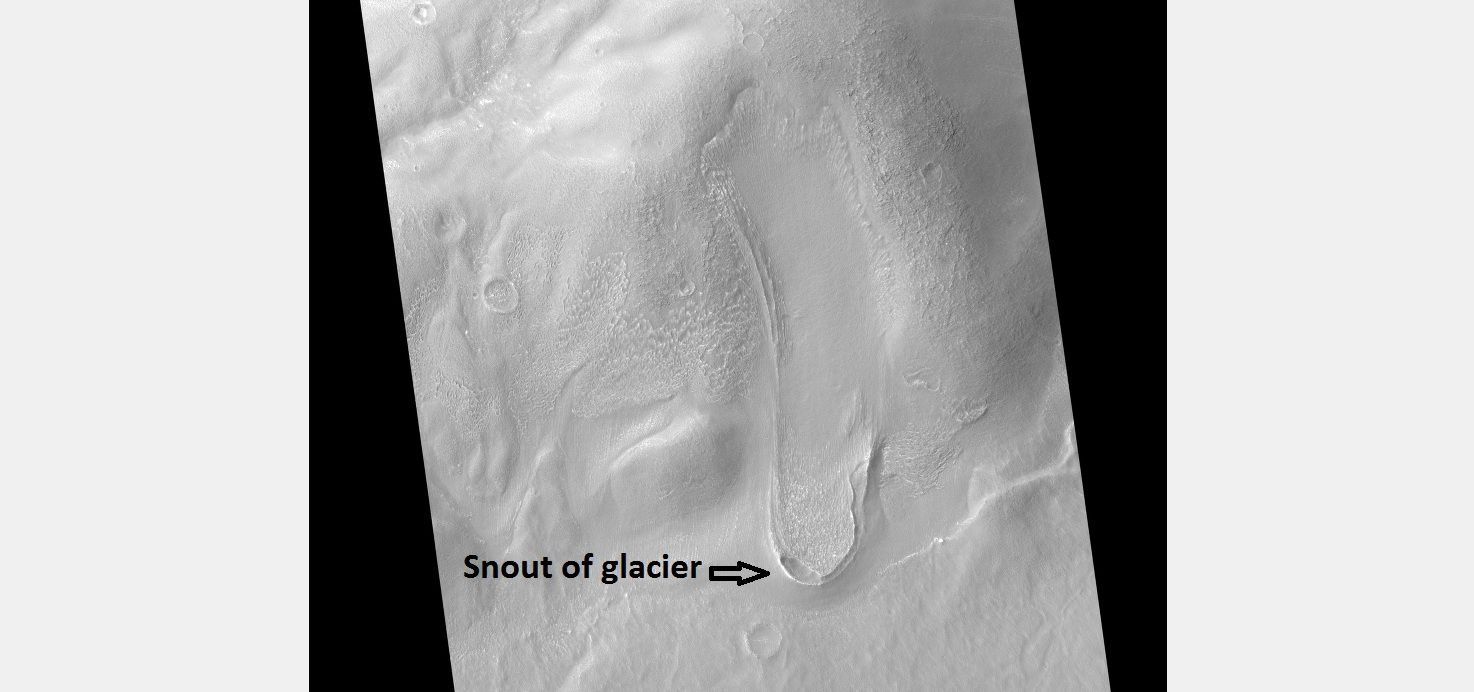
Tongue-shaped glacier, as seen by HiRISE under the HiWish program. Ice may exist in the glacier, even today, beneath an insulating layer of dirt. Location is Hellas quadrangle.

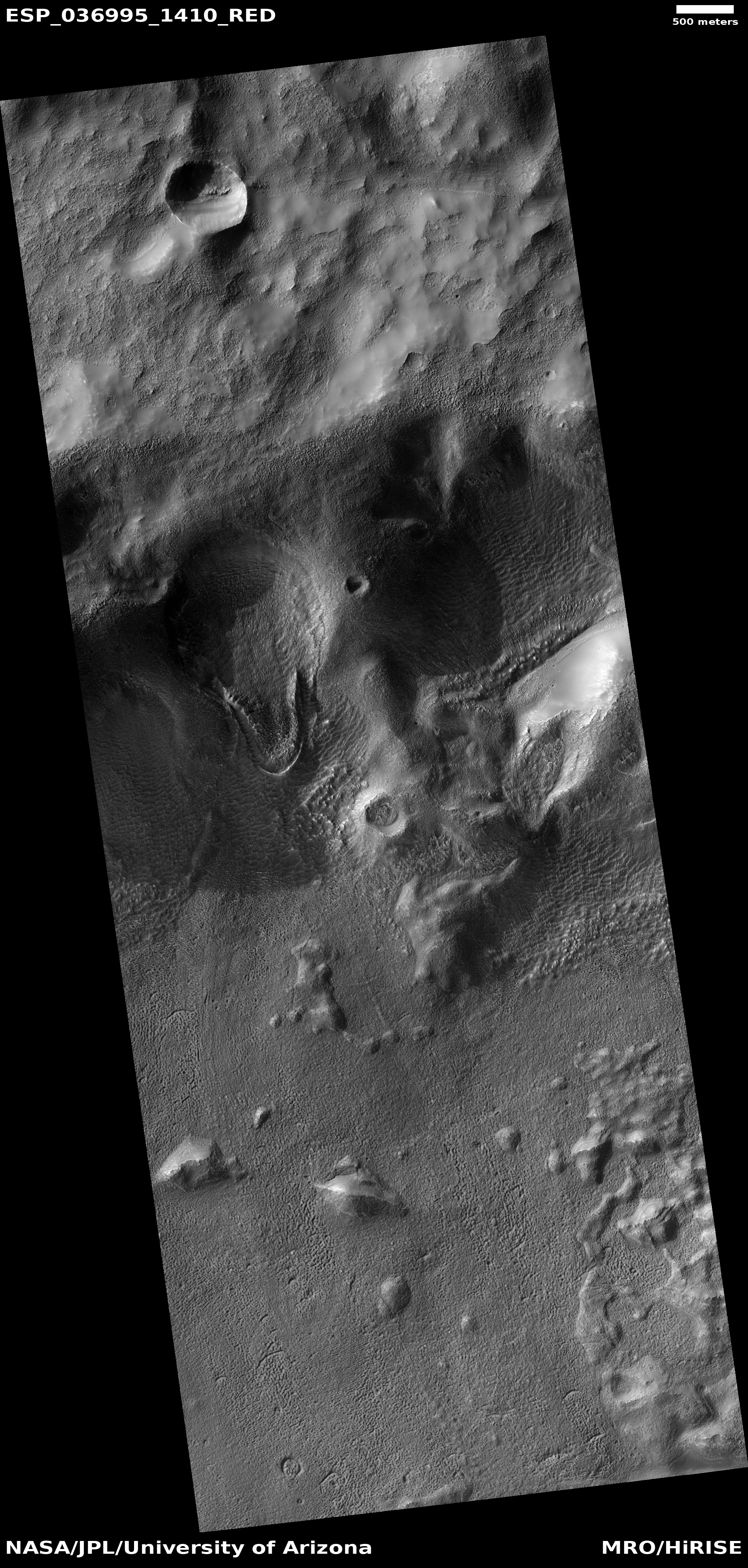
Tongue-shaped glacier, as seen by HiRISE under the HiWish program. Location is Phaethontis quadrangle.

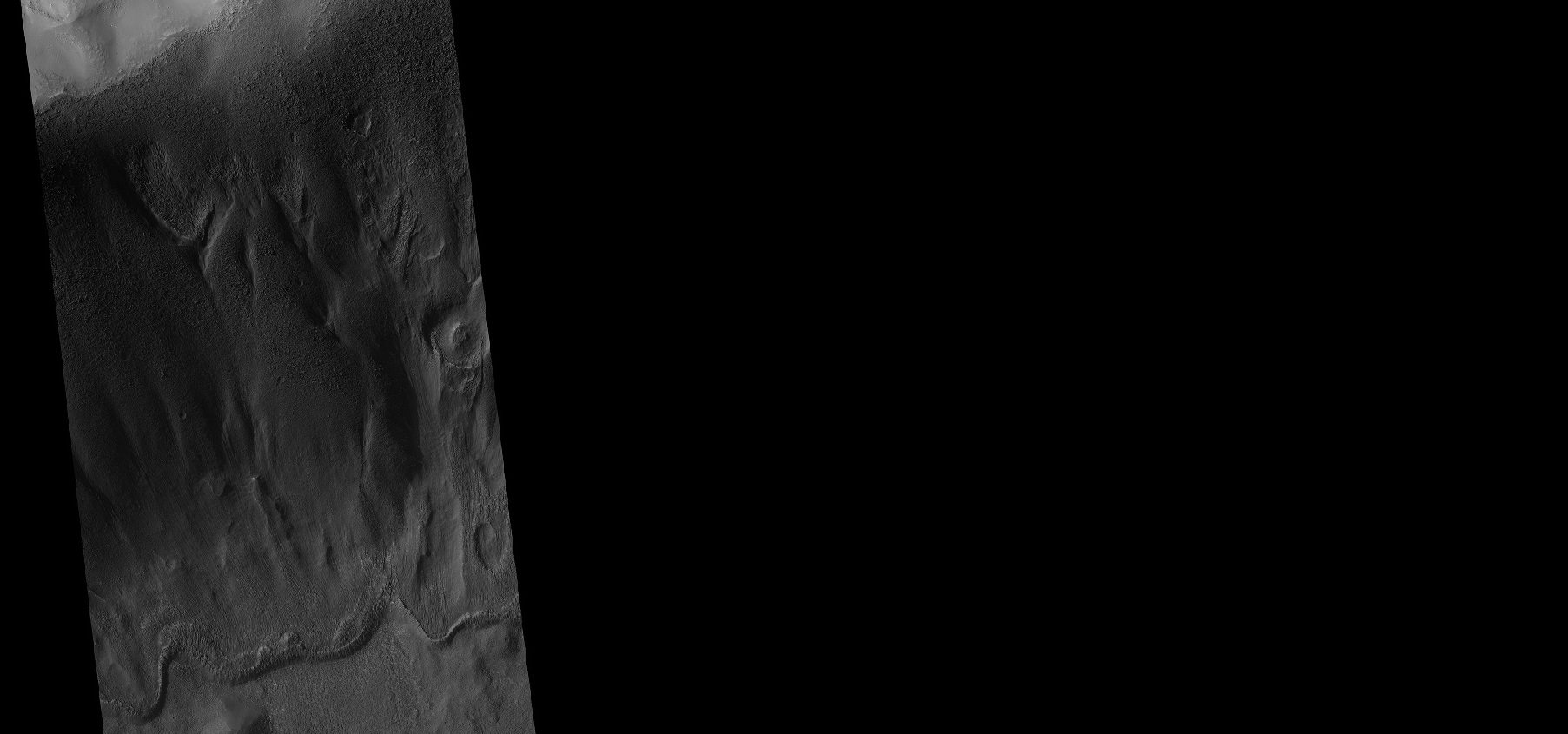
Wide view of several tongue-shaped glaciers on wall of crater, as seen by HiRISE under the HiWish program. The glaciers are of different sizes and lie at different levels. Some of these are greatly enlarged in pictures which follow.

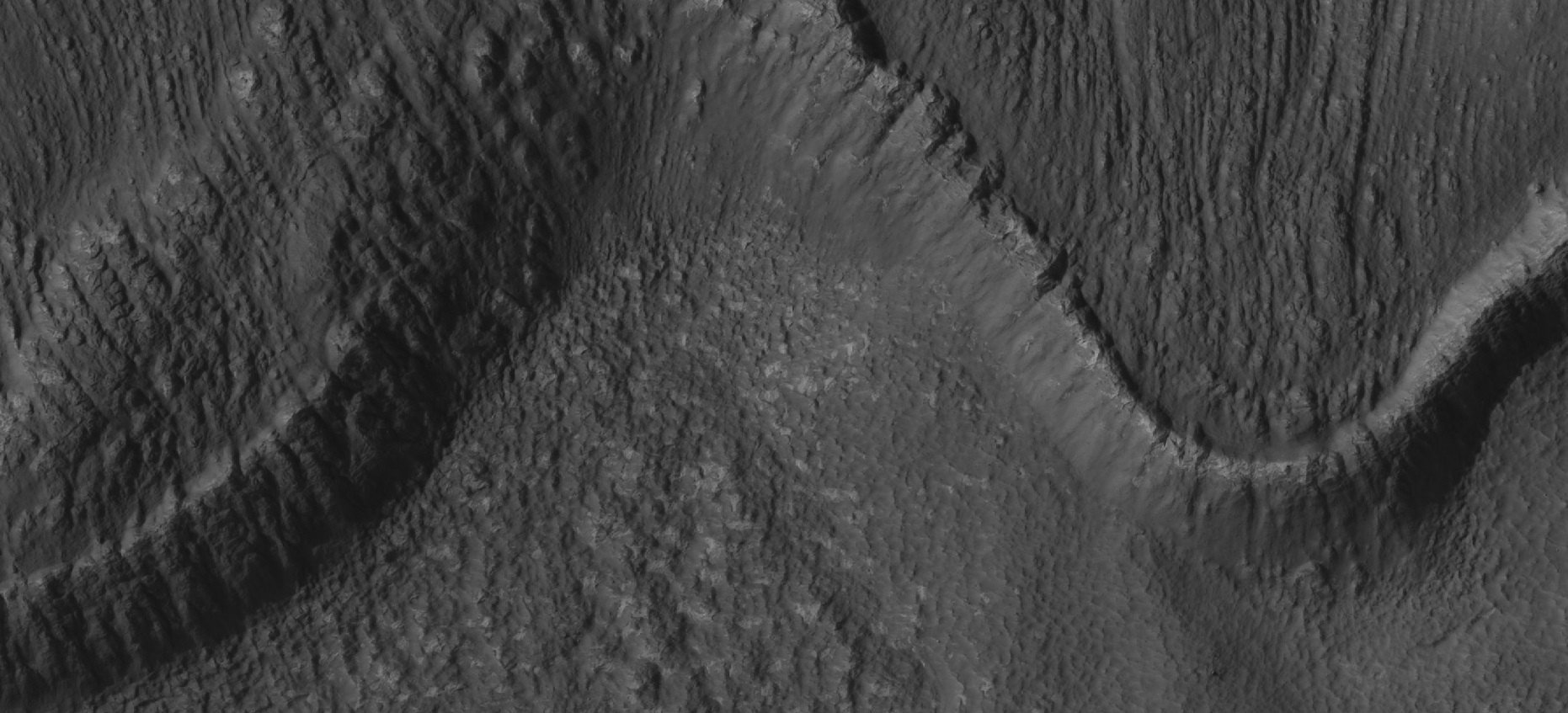
Close-up of the snouts of two glaciers from the previous image, as seen by HiRISE under the HiWish program. These are towards the bottom left of the previous image.

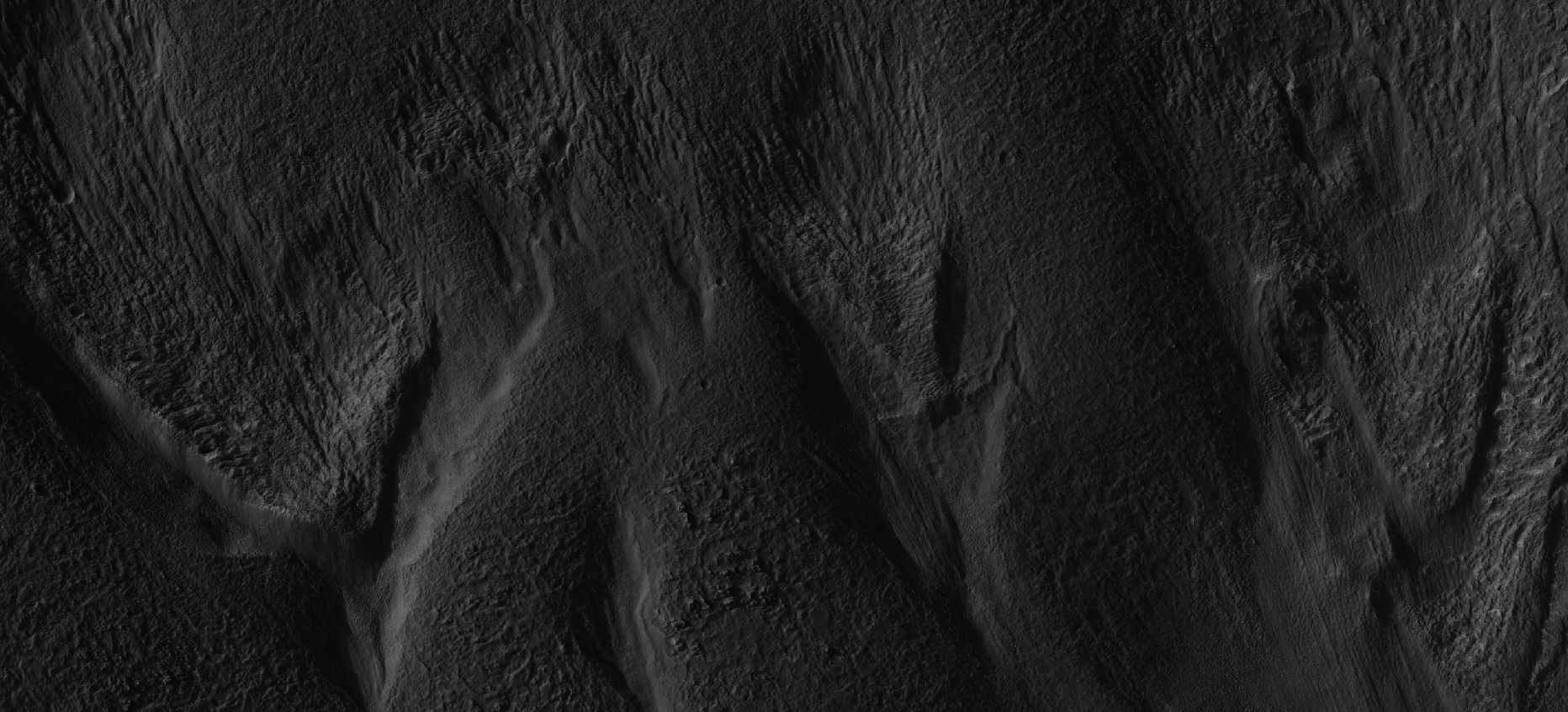
Close-up of small glaciers from a previous image, as seen by HiRISE under the HiWish program. Some of these glaciers seem to be just starting to form.

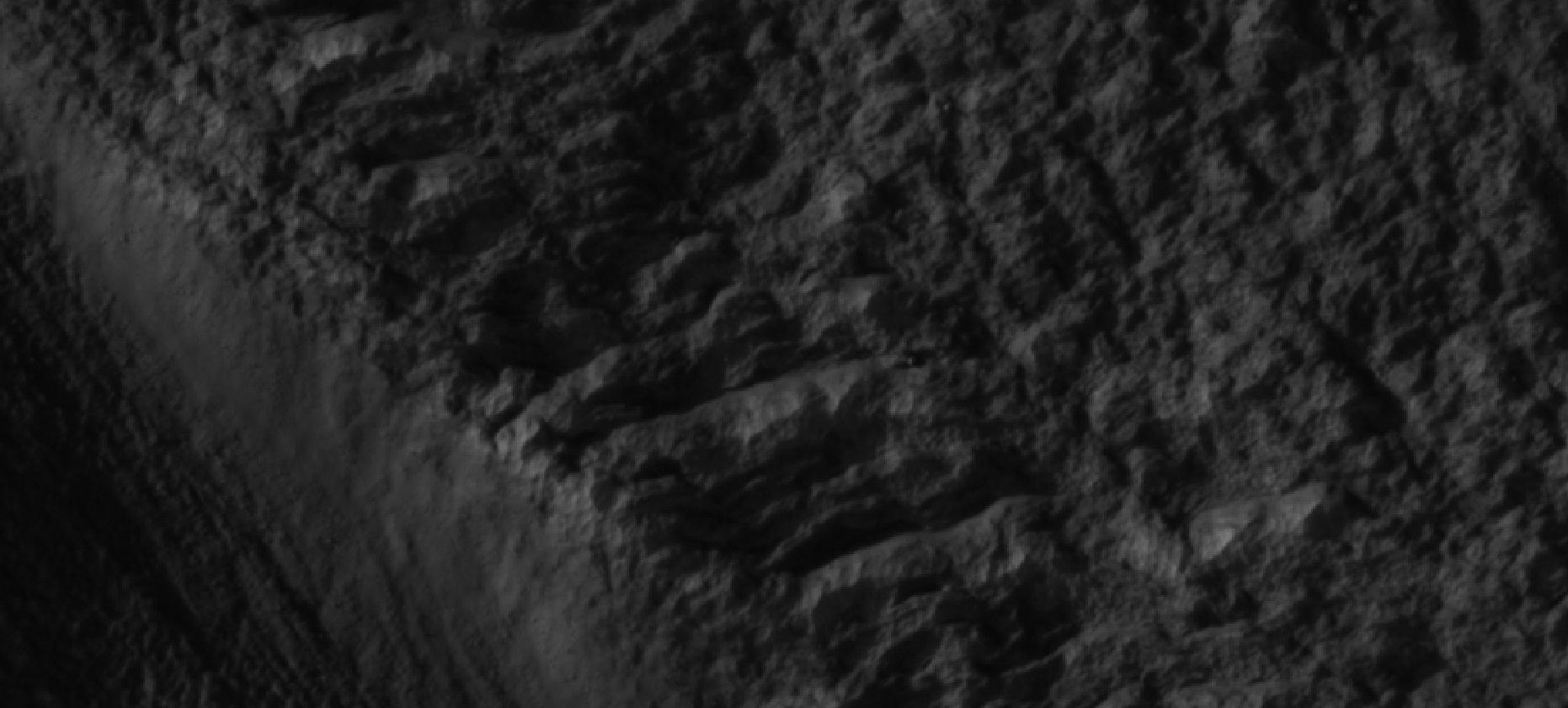
Close-up of the edge of one of the glaciers on the bottom of the wide view from a previous image Picture was taken by HiRISE under the HiWish program.

Other ice-related features

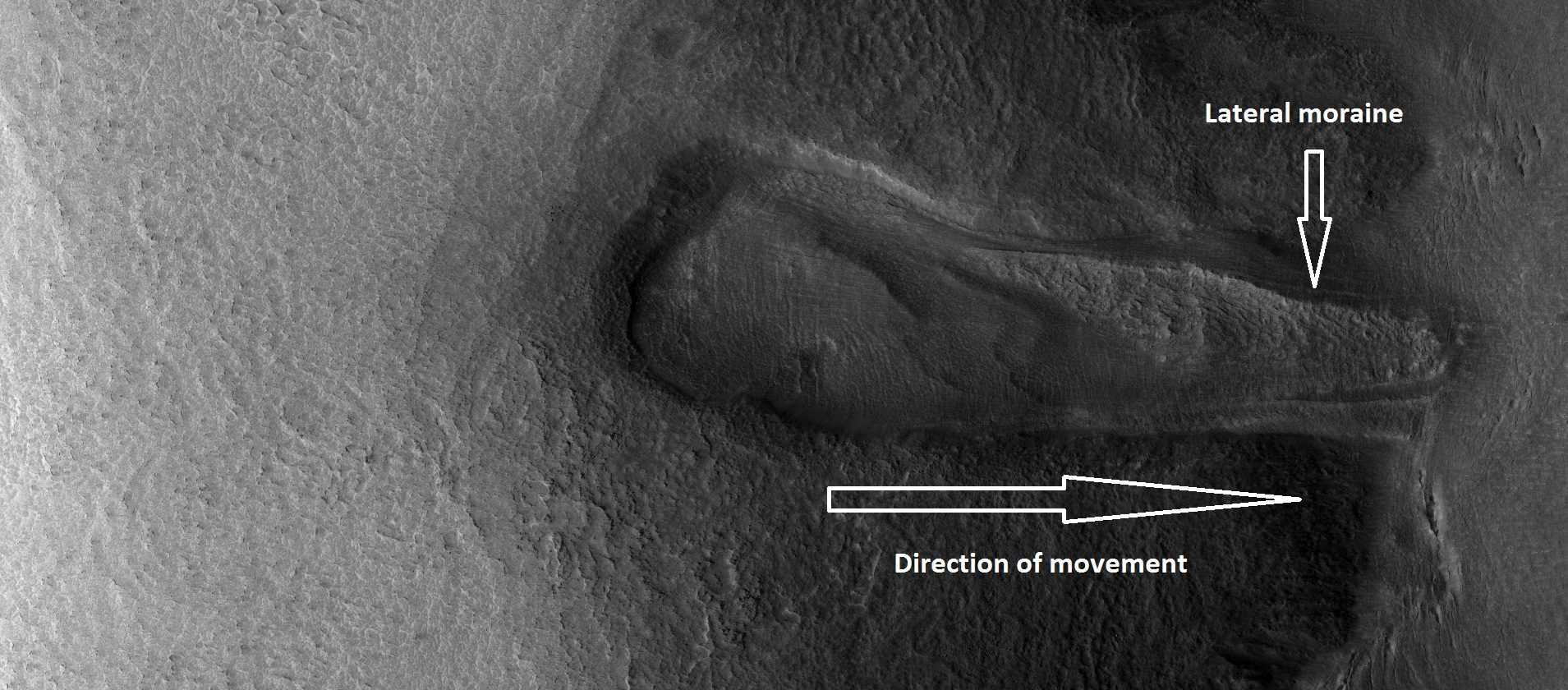
Martian glacier moving down a valley, as seen by HiRISE under HiWish program.
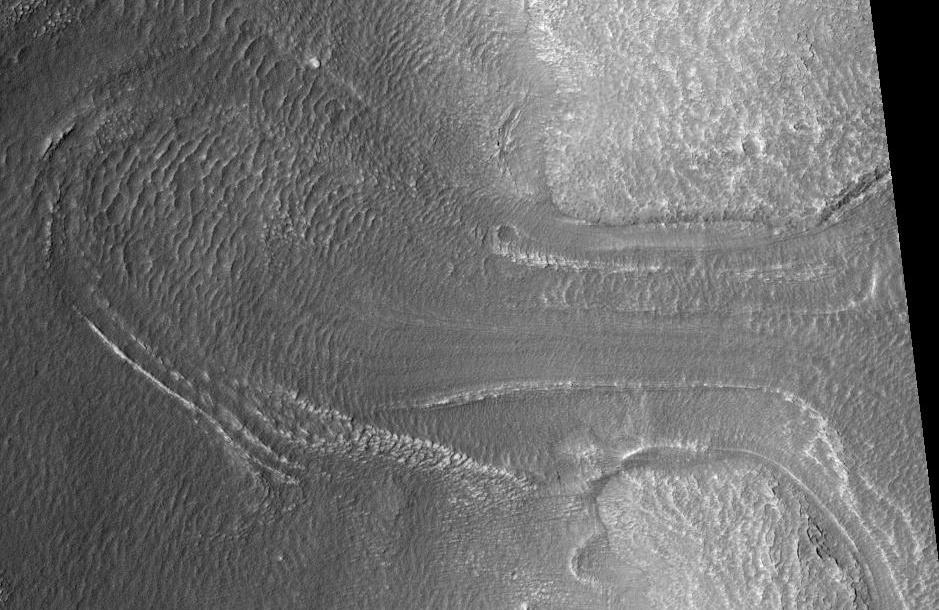
Probable glacier as seen by HiRISE under HiWish program. Radar studies have found that it is made up of almost totally of pure ice. It appears to be moving from the high ground (a mesa) on the right. Location is Ismenius Lacus quadrangle.

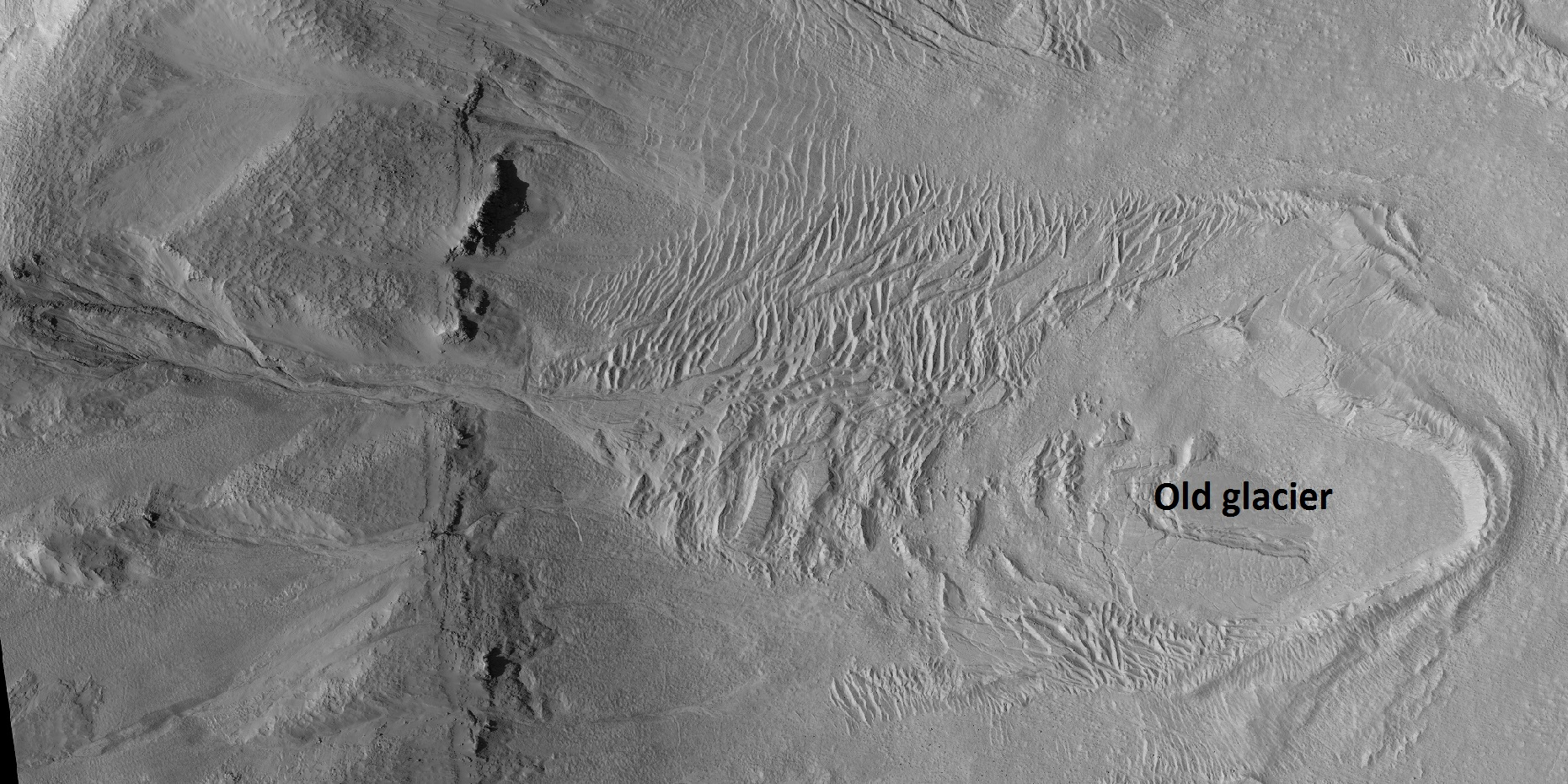
Glacier on a crater floor, as seen by HiRISE under HiWish program The cracks in the glacier may be crevasses. There is also a gully system on the crater wall. Location is Casius quadrangle.

== Exposed ice sheets ==
Huge, easy to get to, deposits of ice were found by a team of researchers using instruments on board the Mars Reconnaissance Orbiter (MRO). The scientists found eight eroding slopes showing exposed water ice sheets as thick as 100 meters. Much evidence of buried ice under the ground on vast regions of Mars has already been found by past studies, but this study found that the ice was only covered by a layer of about 1 or 2 meters thick of soil. Shane Byrne of the University of Arizona Lunar and Planetary Laboratory, Tucson, one of the co-authors remarked that future colonists of the Red Planet would be able to gather up ice with just a bucket and shovel. The layered ice is exposed in triangular shaped depressions. One wall is very steep and faces the pole. The fact that water-ice makes up the layers was confirmed by Compact Reconnaissance Imaging Spectrometer for Mars (CRISM) on board the Mars Reconnaissance Orbiter (MRO). The spectra gathered by CRISM showed strong signals of water.

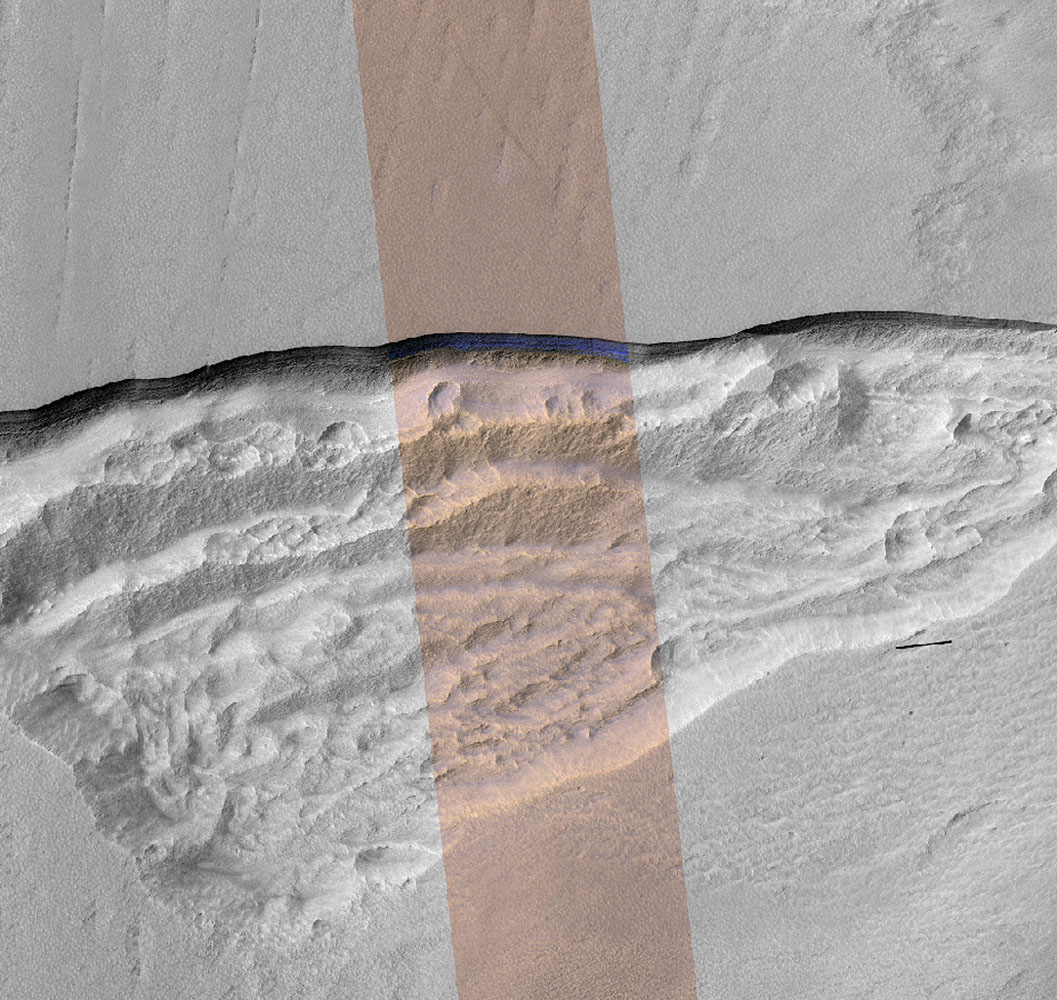
Wide view of triangular depression, as seen by HiRISE. The colored strip shows the part of the image that can be seen in color. The wall at the top of the depression contains pure ice. This wall faces the south pole. Location is Hellas quadrangle.

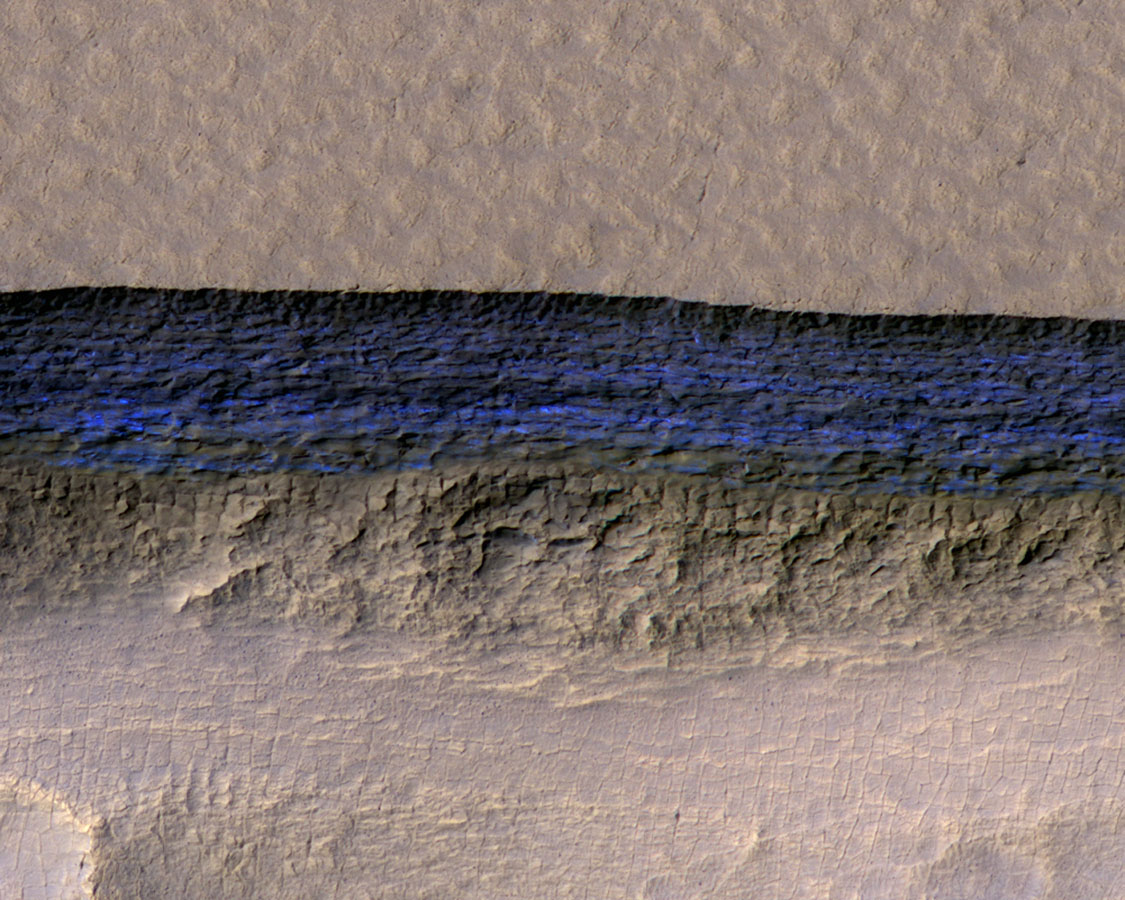
Close, color view of wall containing ice from previous image, as seen by HiRISE
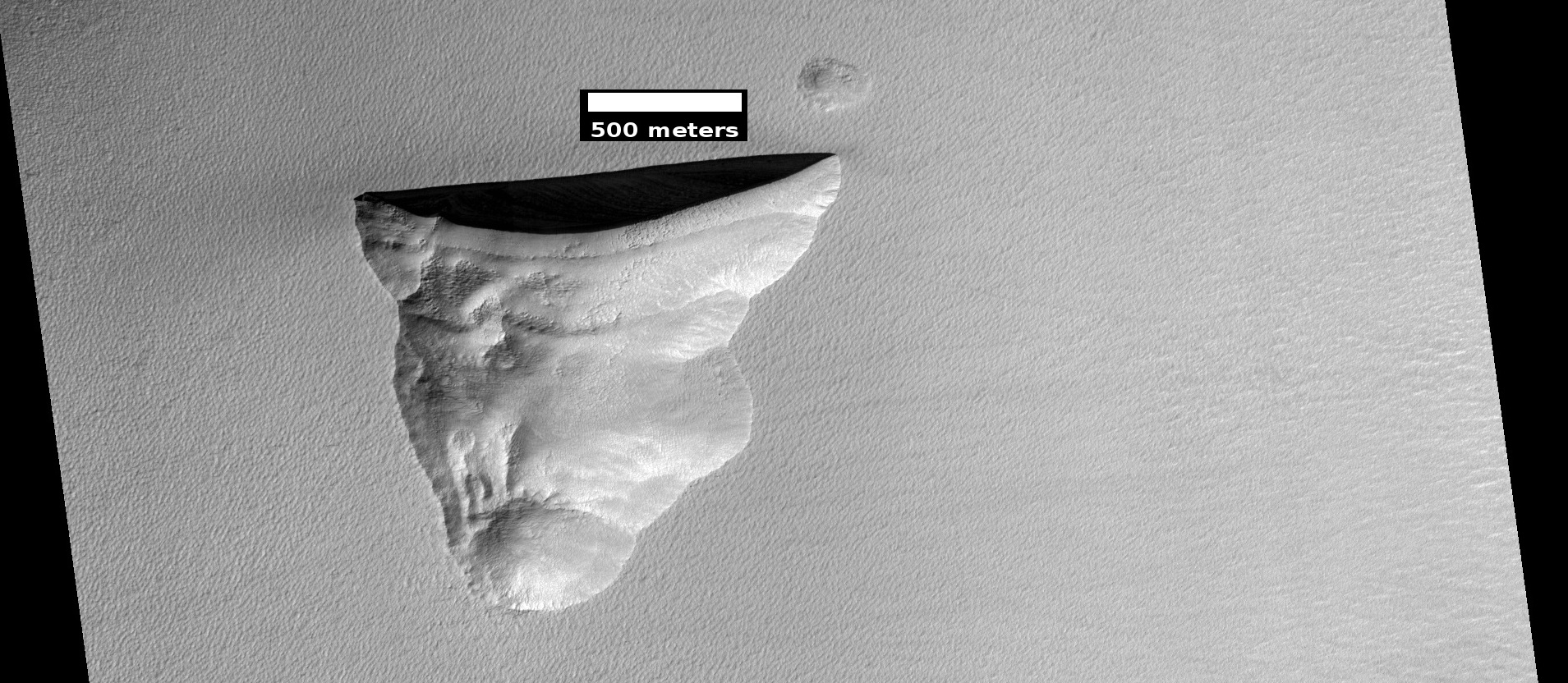
Wide view of triangular depression, as seen by HiRISE. The wall which faces the south pole contains ice in distinct layers that are visible in next image. Location is Hellas quadrangle.

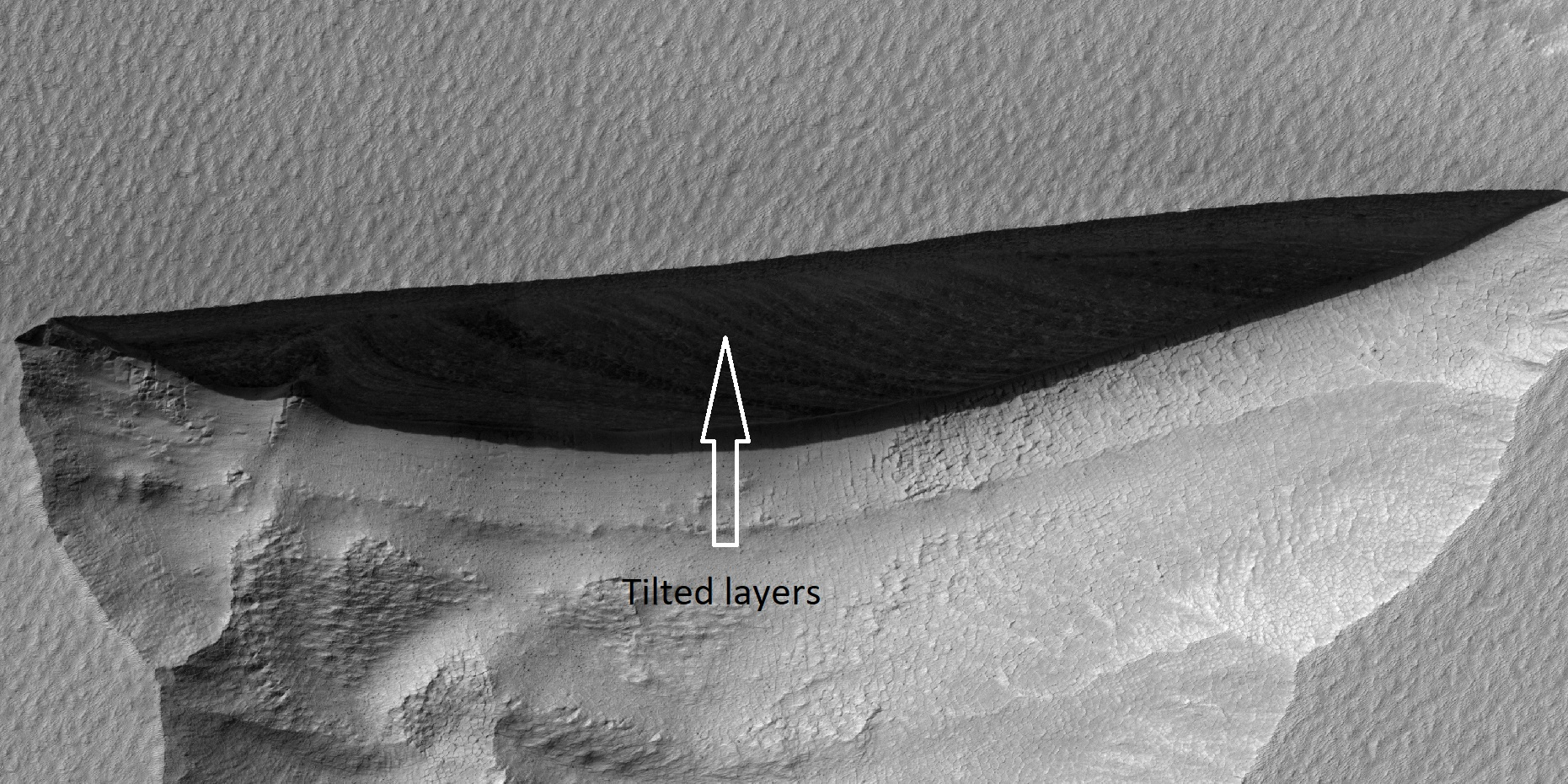
Close view of wall of triangular depression, as seen by HiRISE. Layers are visible in the wall. The lower layers are tilted, while layers near the surface are more or less horizontal. Such an arrangement of layers is called an "angular unconformity."

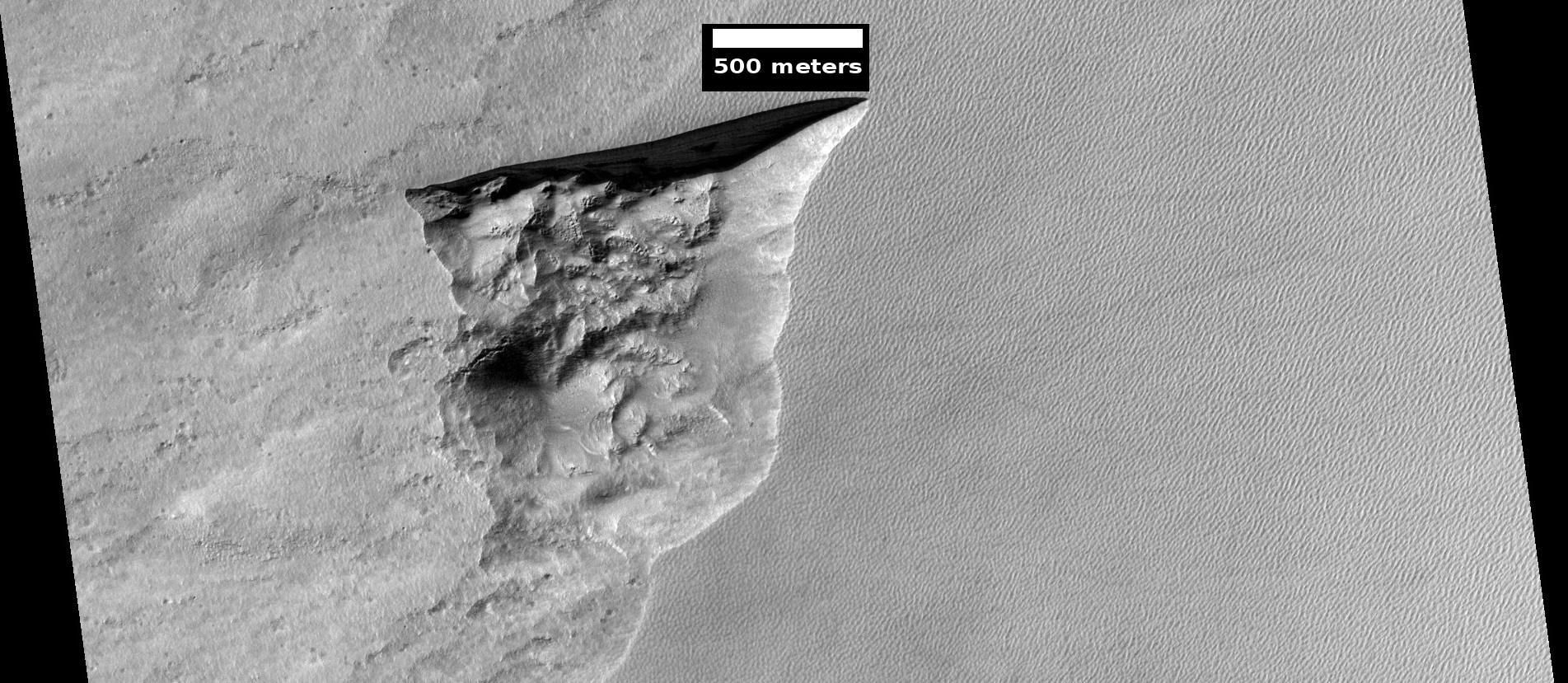
Wide view of triangular depression, as seen by HiRISE. The wall which faces the south pole contains ice in distinct layers that are visible in next image. Location is Hellas quadrangle.

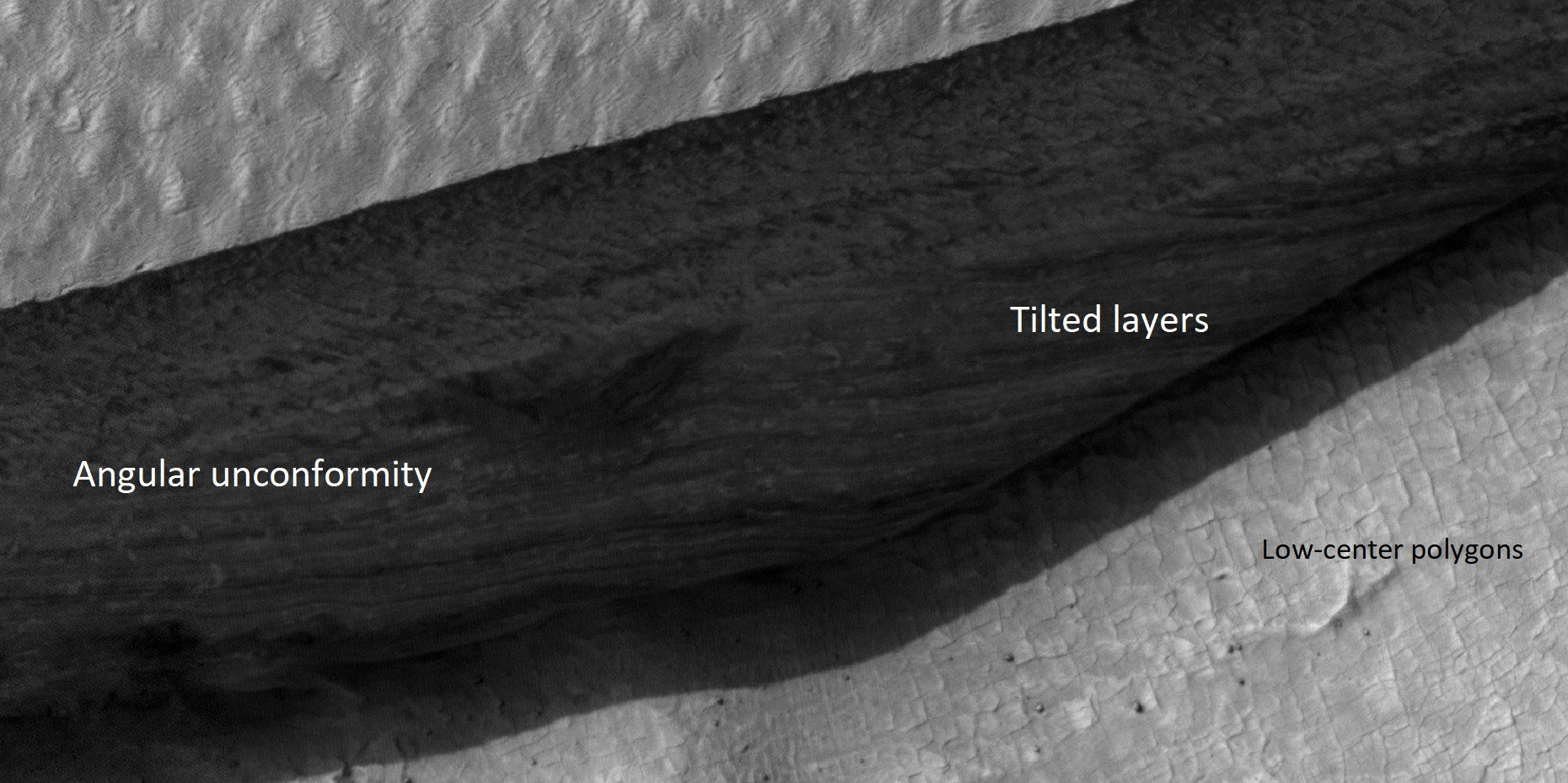
Close view of wall of triangular depression, as seen by HiRISE layers are visible in the wall. The lower layers are tilted, while layers near the surface are more or less horizontal. Such an arrangement of layers is called an "angular unconformity."
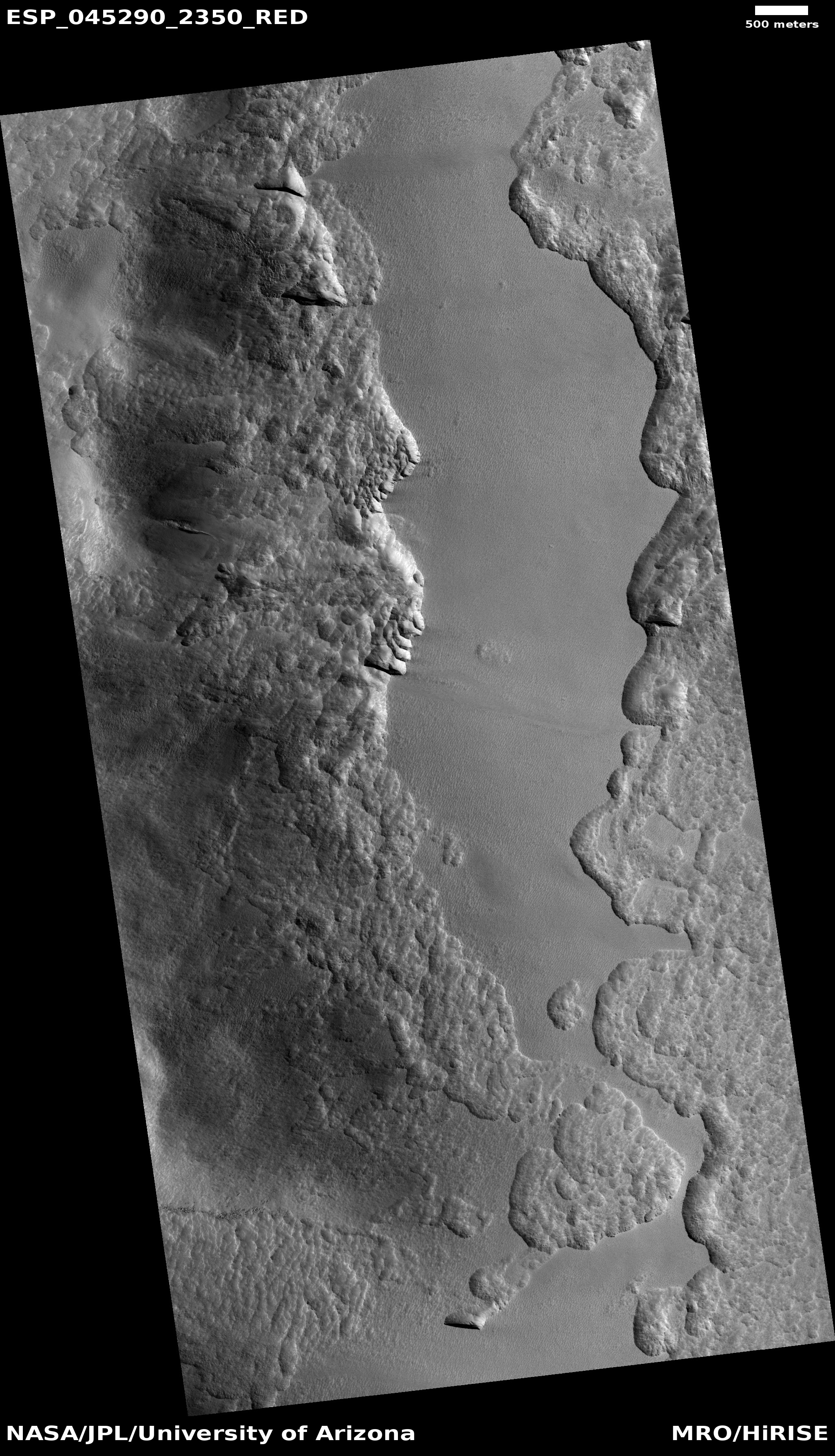
Wide view of part of Milankovic Crater, as seen by HiRISE under HiWish program. Many depressions here contain ice in their walls.

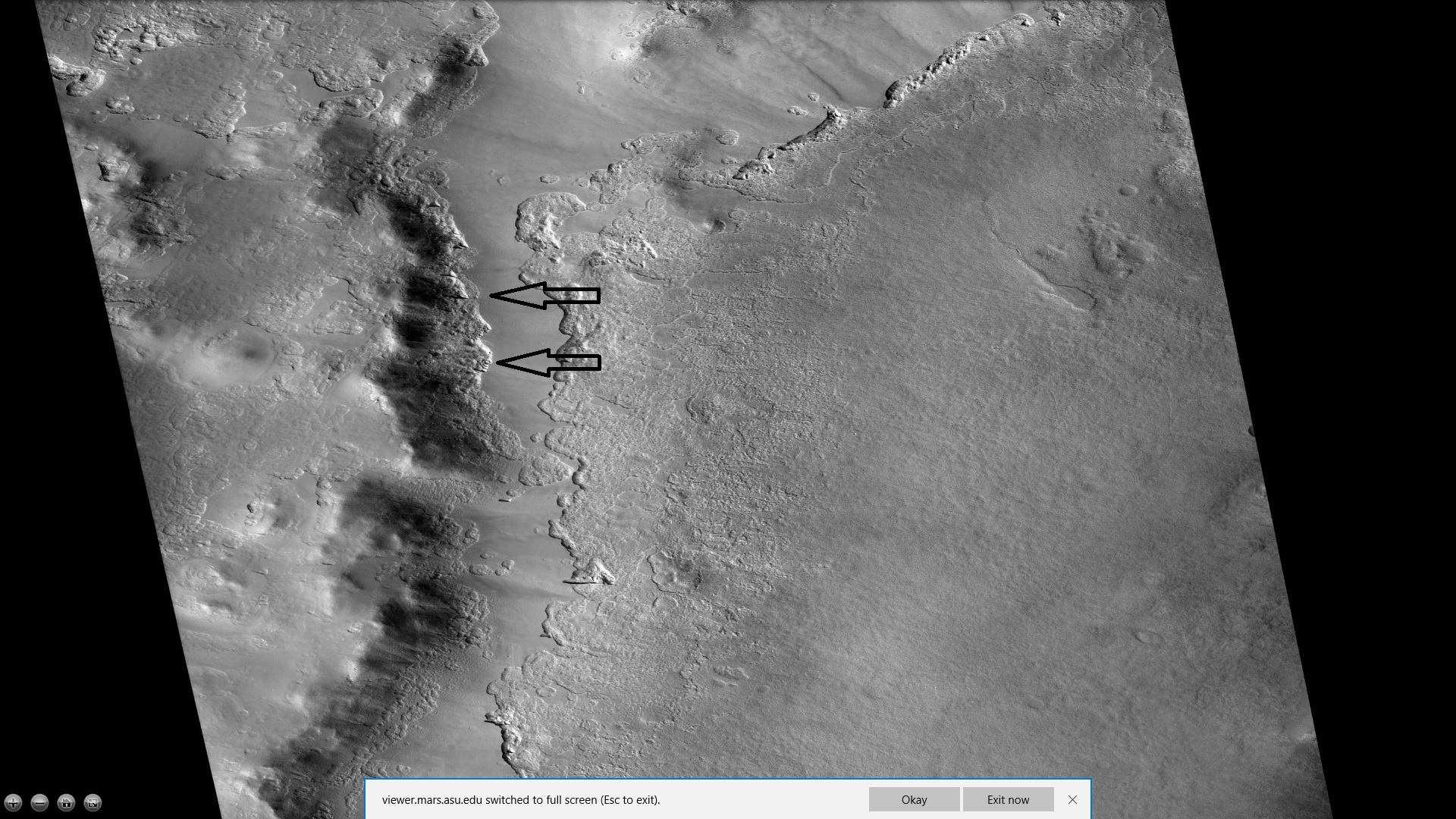
Wide view of part of Milankovic Crater, as seen by HiRISE under HiWish program. Arrows indicate places where ice is near surface.

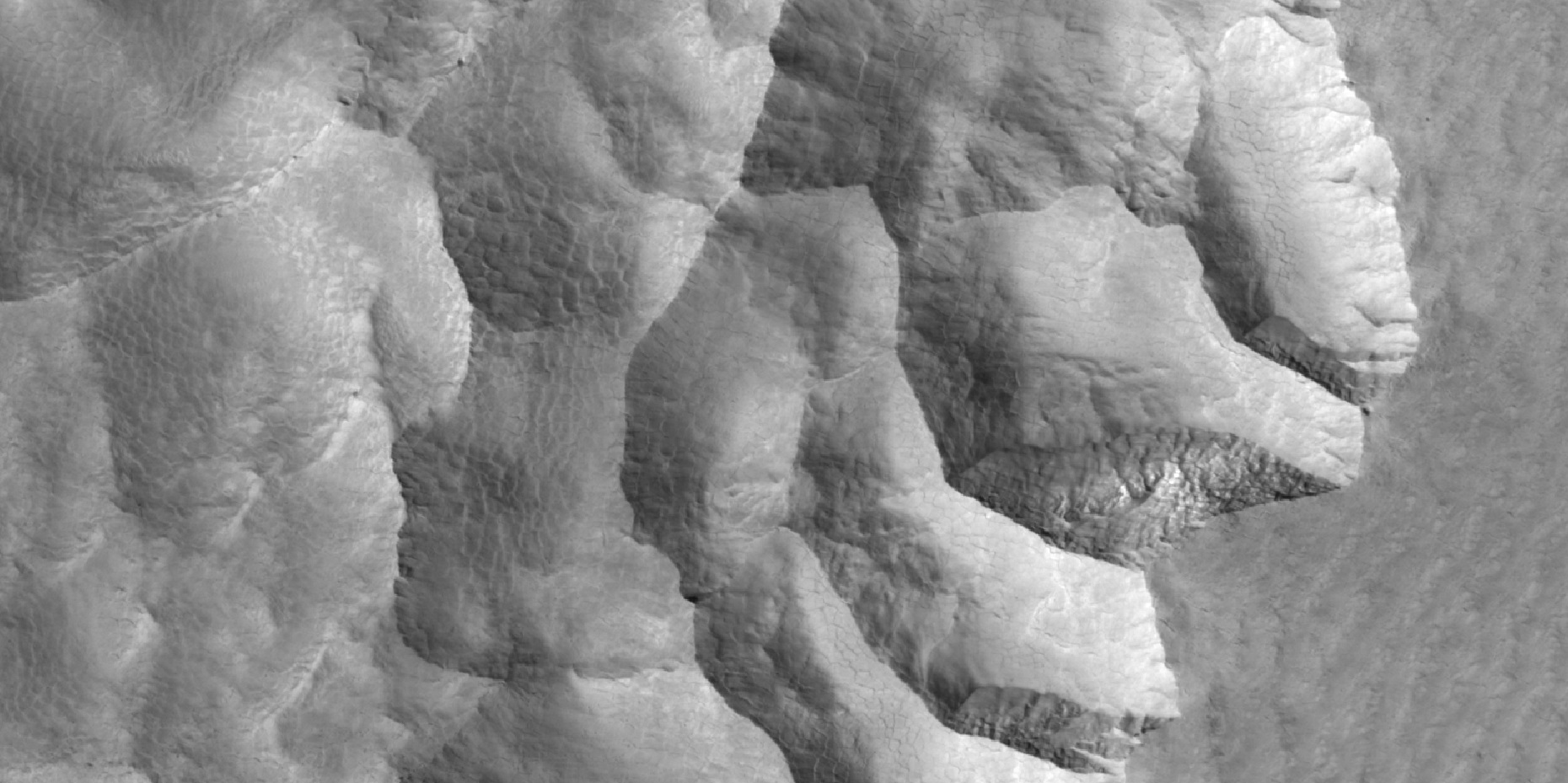
Close view of what is thought to be an ice rich area. Image taken with HiRISE under HiWish program.

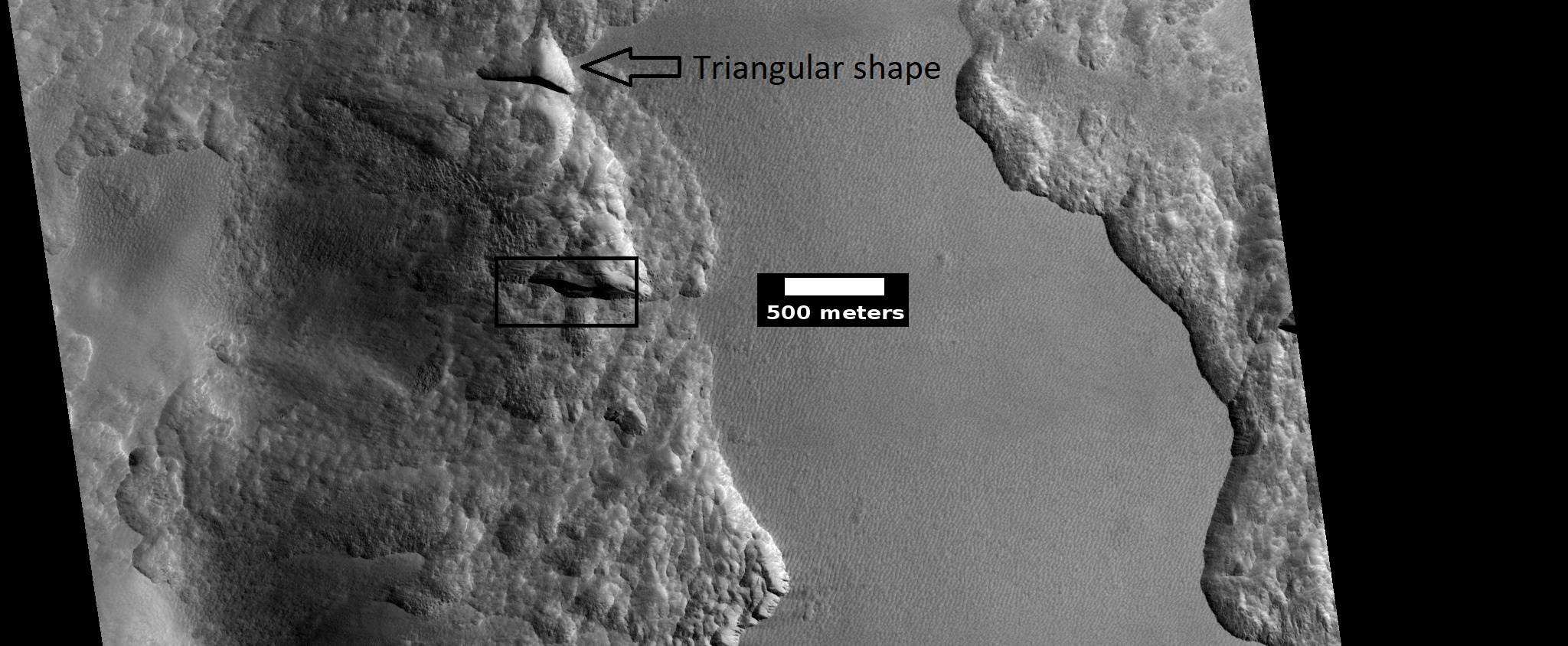
Close view from a previous image, as seen by HiRISE under HiWish program The triangular shape of some depressions are noted. The area in the box is enlarged in following images.

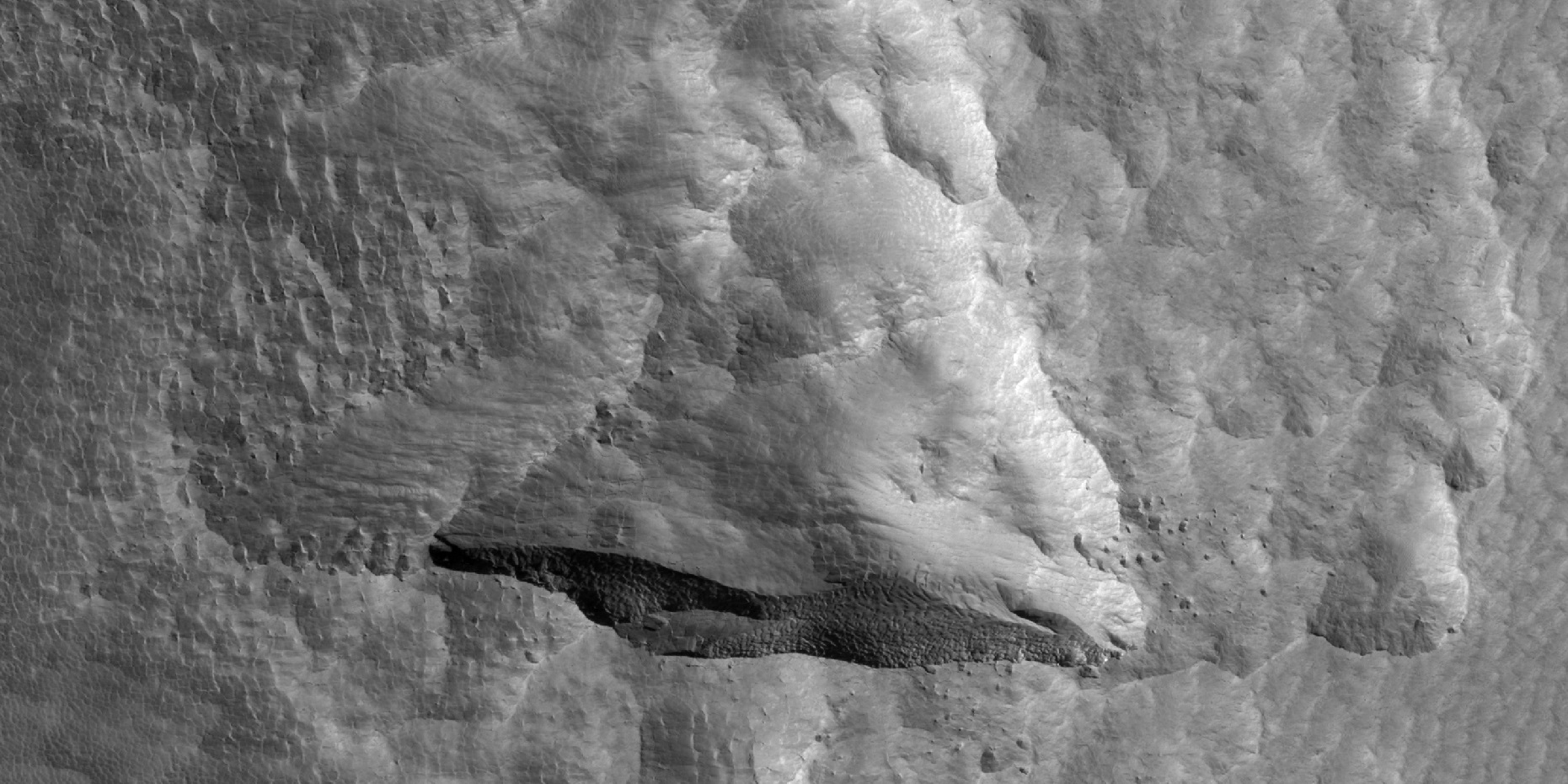
Close view of depression, as seen by HiRISE under HiWish program Straight, steep wall near the bottom faces the north pole.

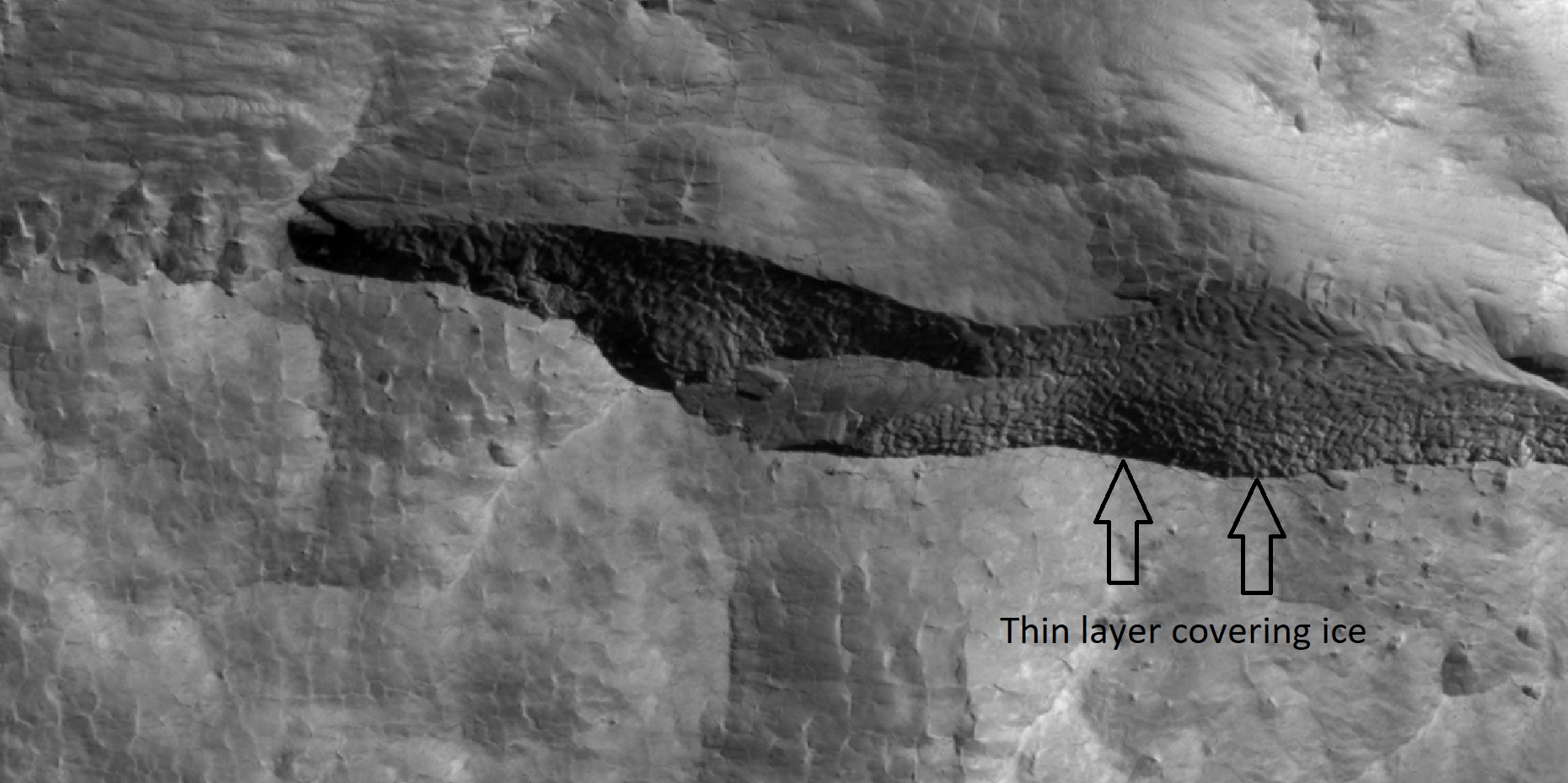
Close view of depression, as seen by HiRISE under HiWish program Arrows indicate where there is a very thin, 1-2 meter covering on what is suspected to be ice.

These triangular depressions bare some resemblance to scalloped terrain. Scalloped topography is common in the mid-latitudes of Mars, between 45° and 60° north and south.

For several reasons, the ice-rich clifts (scarps) are suspected to be ground ice instead of thin, temporary frost. Their blue color stays even after seasonal frost, indicated by blue color, has disappeared from the surroundings and from higher, colder locations. Also, Thermal Emission Imaging System (THEMIS) measurements show a temperature in the late-afternoon that is above the frost point. This means that any frost would have melted in the heat of the day. "There is shallow ground ice under roughly a third of the Martian surface," said the study's lead author, Colin Dundas of the U.S. Geological Survey's Astrogeology Science Center in Flagstaff, Arizona. " This image confirms what was previously detected with the spectrometer on 2001 Mars Odyssey, the ground-penetrating radars on MRO and on Mars Express, and by the Phoenix lander in situ excavation. The Phoenix lander actually exposed an ice layer with its landing rockets. Besides being of immense value to future explorers, these ice layers could help us better understand the climate history of Mars. They provide a record of the past. Since Mars experiences great variations in its tilt, it also goes through dramatic climate variations. These changes may be able to be tracked with study of these layers. Mars does not possess a large moon to keep its tilt stable. Today, ice is concentrated at the poles, with a greater tilt, more ice will exist at mid-latitudes.

== Scalloped topography ==
Scalloped topography is common in the mid-latitudes of Mars, between 45° and 60° north and south. It is particularly prominent in the region of Utopia Planitia in the northern hemisphere and in the region of Peneus and Amphitrites Patera in the southern hemisphere. Such topography consists of shallow, rimless depressions with scalloped edges, commonly referred to as "scalloped depressions" or simply "scallops". Scalloped depressions can be isolated or clustered and sometimes seem to coalesce. A typical scalloped depression displays a gentle equator-facing slope and a steeper pole-facing scarp. This topographic asymmetry is probably due to differences in insolation. Scalloped depressions are thought to form from the removal of subsurface material, possibly interstitial ice, by sublimation. This process may still be happening at present.

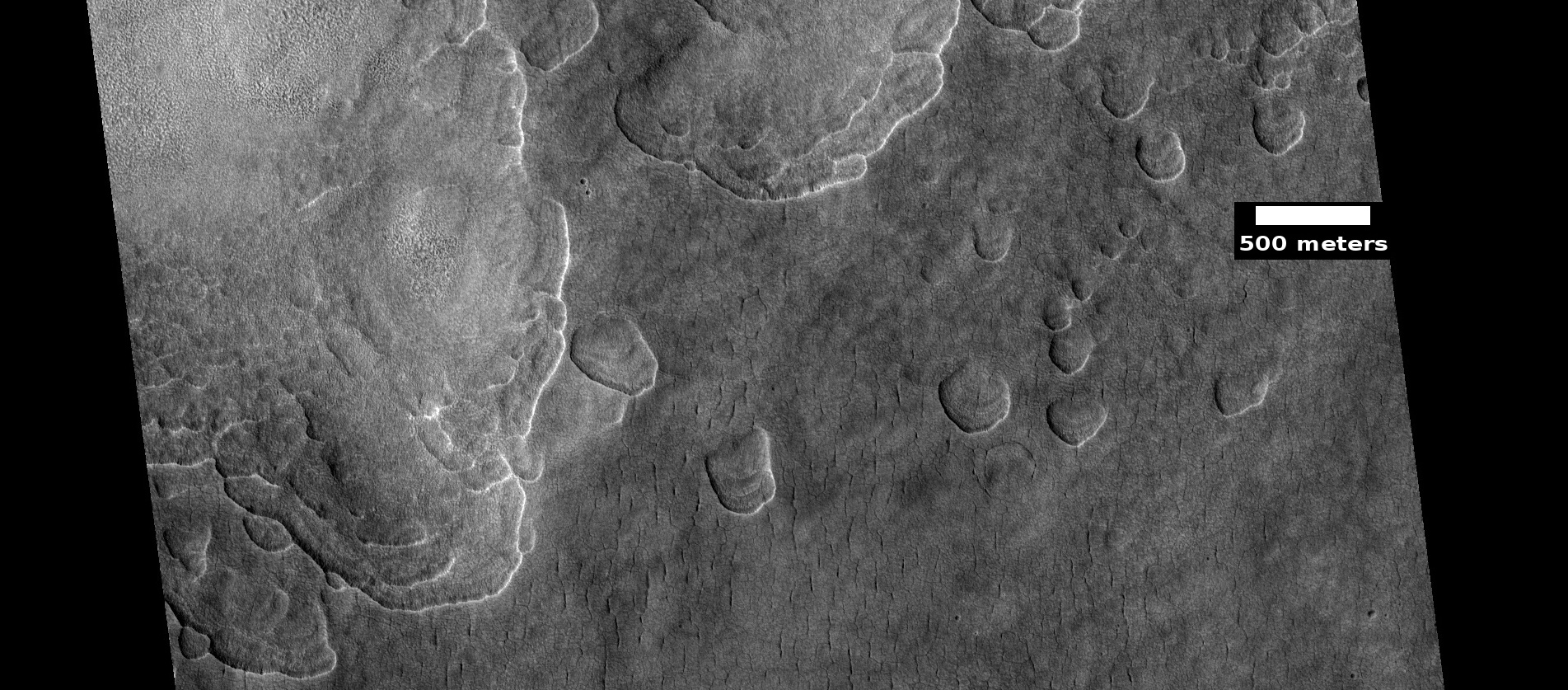
Scalloped ground, as seen by HiRISE under HiWish program.

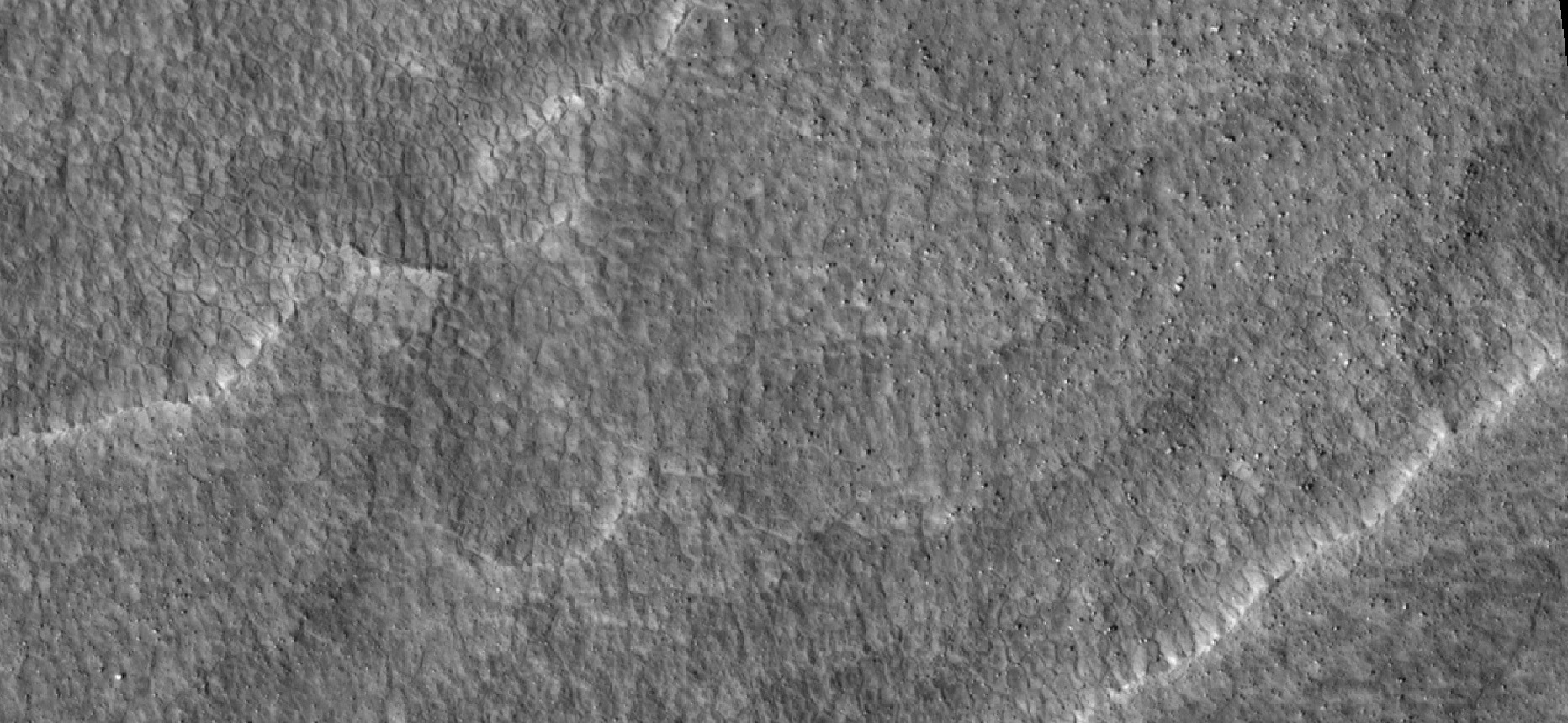
Close-up of scalloped ground, as seen by HiRISE under HiWish program. Surface is divided into polygons; these forms are common where ground freezes and thaws. Note: this is an enlargement of a previous image.

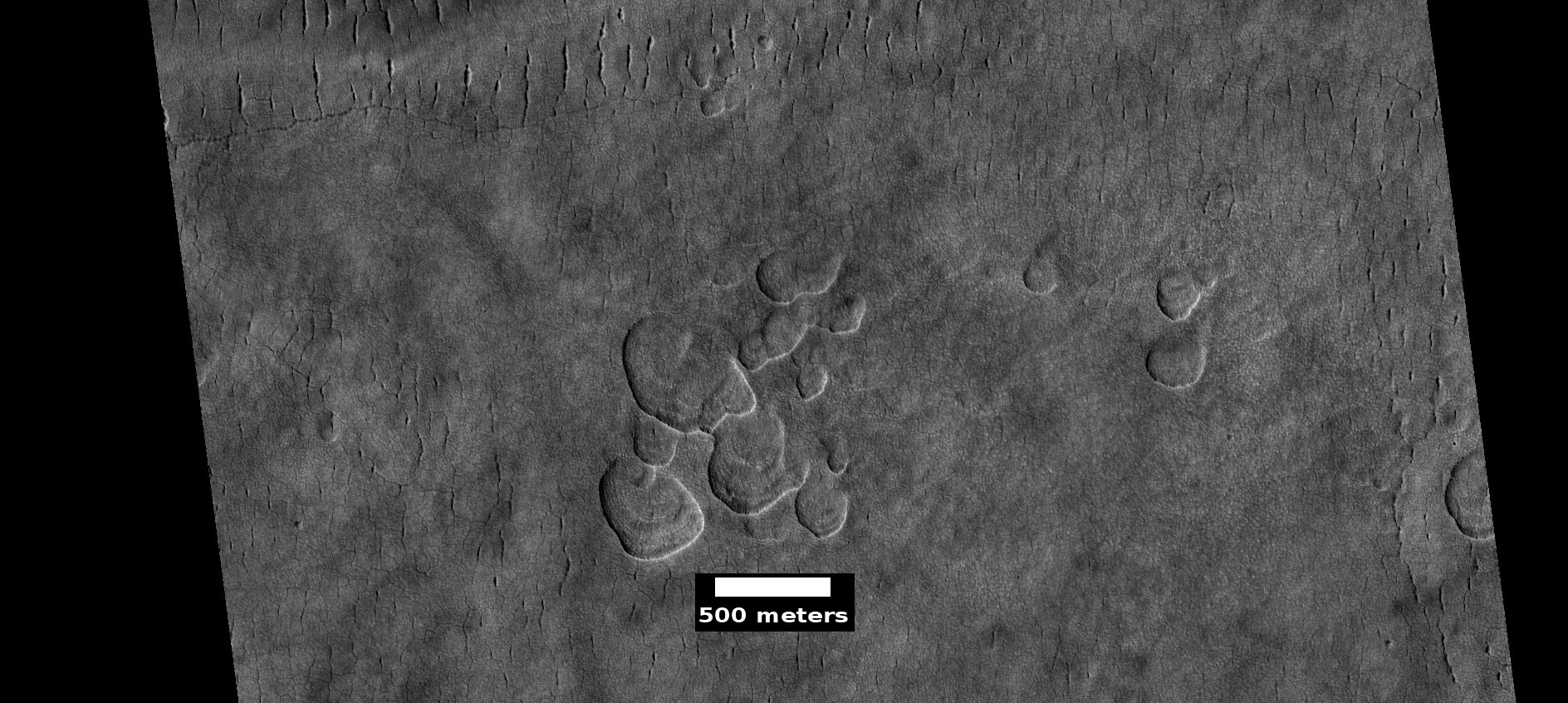
Scalloped ground, as seen by HiRISE under HiWish program.

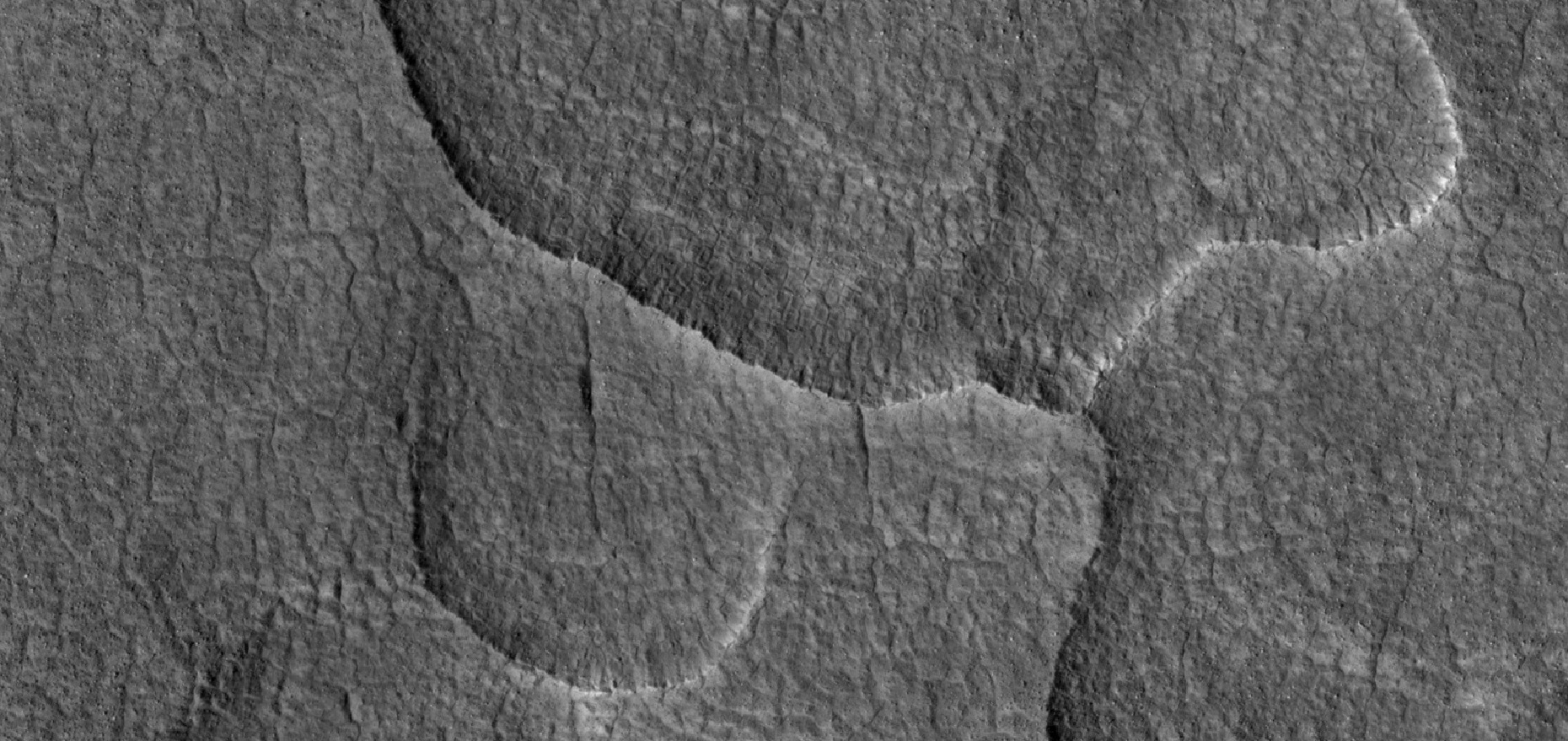
Close-up of scalloped ground, as seen by HiRISE under HiWish program. Surface is divided into polygons; these forms are common where ground freezes and thaws. Note: this is an enlargement of a previous image.

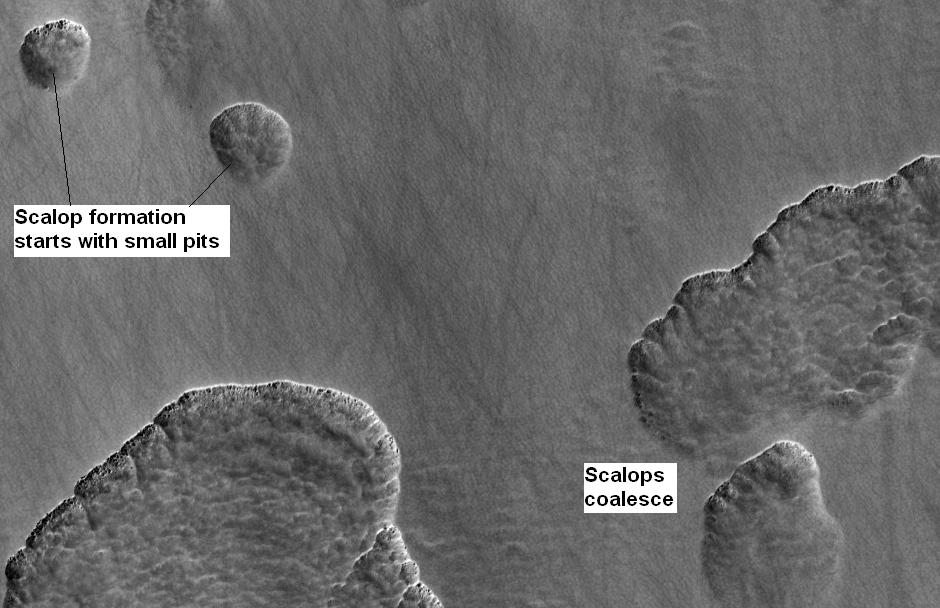
Stages in scallop formation, as seen by HiRISE. Location is Hellas quadrangle.

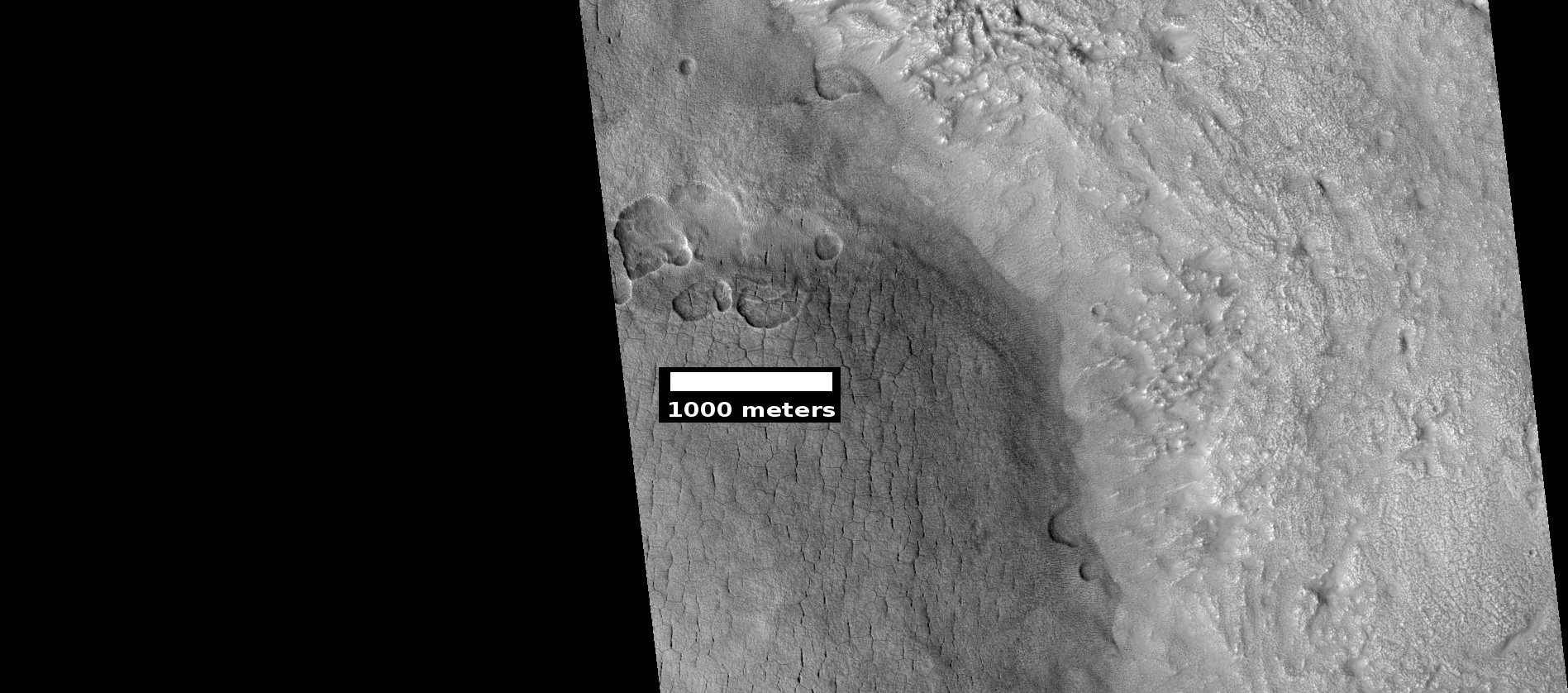
Periglacial Scallops and polygons, as seen by HiRISE under HiWish program.

== Ice in craters ==
Research, reported in the journal Science in September 2009, demonstrated that some new craters on Mars show exposed, pure, water ice. After a time, the ice disappears, evaporating into the atmosphere. The ice is only a few feet deep. The ice was confirmed with the Compact Imaging Spectrometer (CRISM) on board the Mars Reconnaissance Orbiter (MRO). The ice was found in five locations. Three of the locations are in the Cebrenia quadrangle. These locations are 55.57° N, 150.62° E; 43.28° N, 176.9° E; and 45° N, 164.5° E. Two others are in the Diacria quadrangle: 46.7° N, 176.8° E and 46.33° N, 176.9° E. This discovery proves that future colonists on Mars will be able to obtain water from a wide variety of locations. The ice can be dug up, melted, then taken apart to provide fresh oxygen and hydrogen for rocket fuel. Hydrogen was the powerful fuel used by the Space Shuttle main engines.

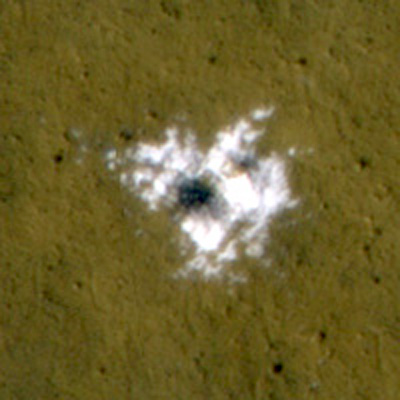
Ice exposed in a fresh crater. These deposits have been found to disappear over time.

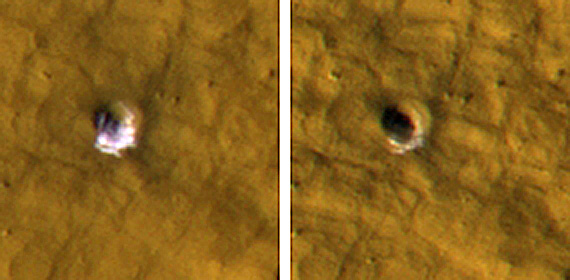
Two pictures from HiRISE showing how ice disappeared over time in a crater. Crater on left is before ice disappeared. Crater is 6 meters in diameter.

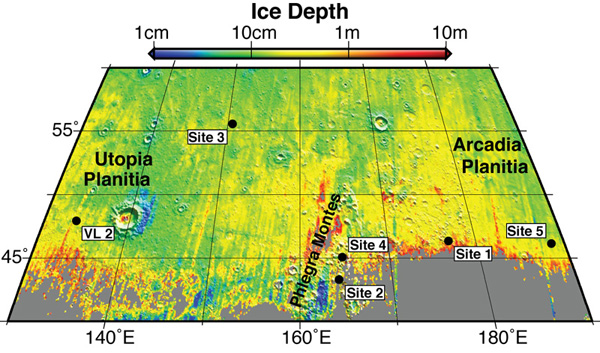
Map showing sites in which ice was found in craters by HiRISE

== Rootless cones ==
So-called "Rootless cones" are caused by explosions of lava with ground ice under the flow. The ice melts and turns into a vapor that expands in an explosion that produces a cone or ring. Features like these are found in Iceland, when lavas cover water-saturated substrates.

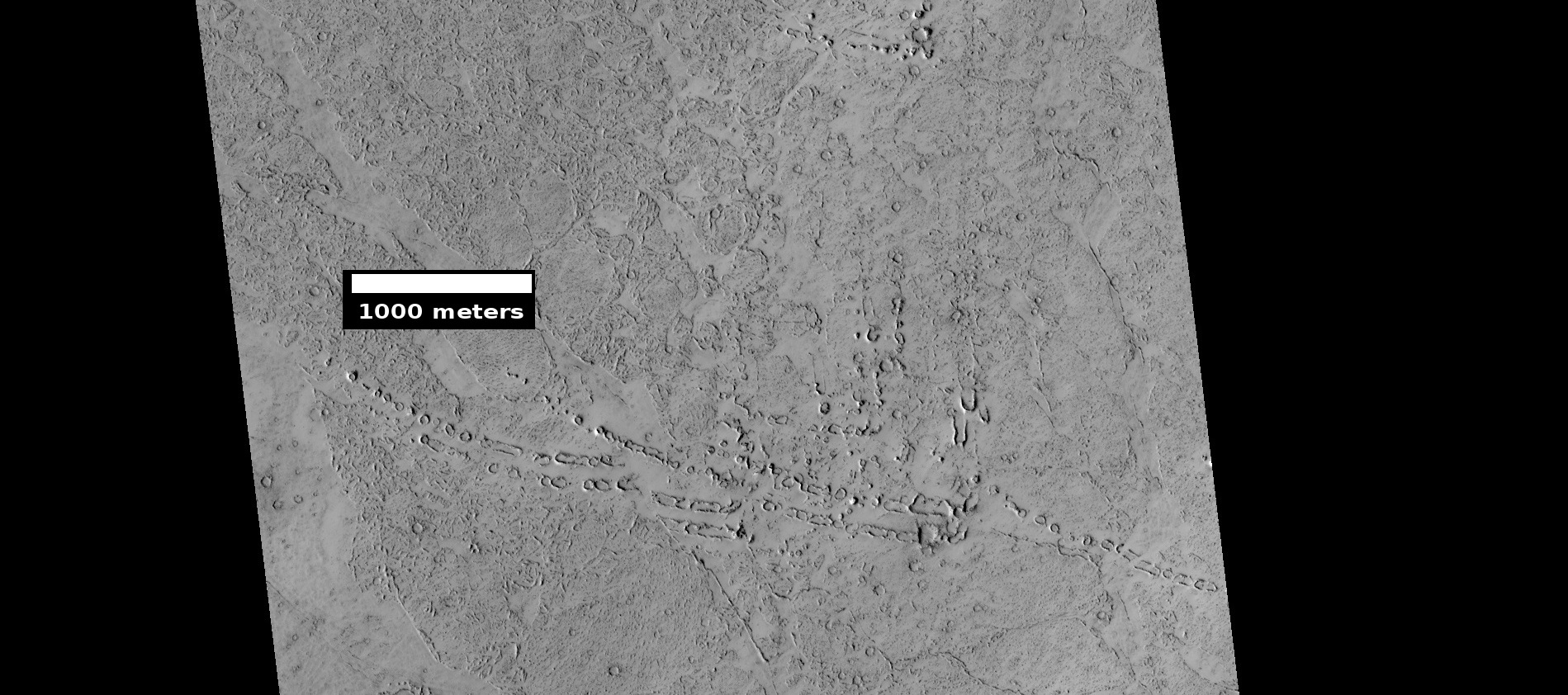
Rootless Cones, as seen by HiRISE under HiWish program. These group of rings or cones are thought to be caused by lava flowing over water ice or ground containing water ice. The ice quickly changes to steam which blows out a ring or cone.

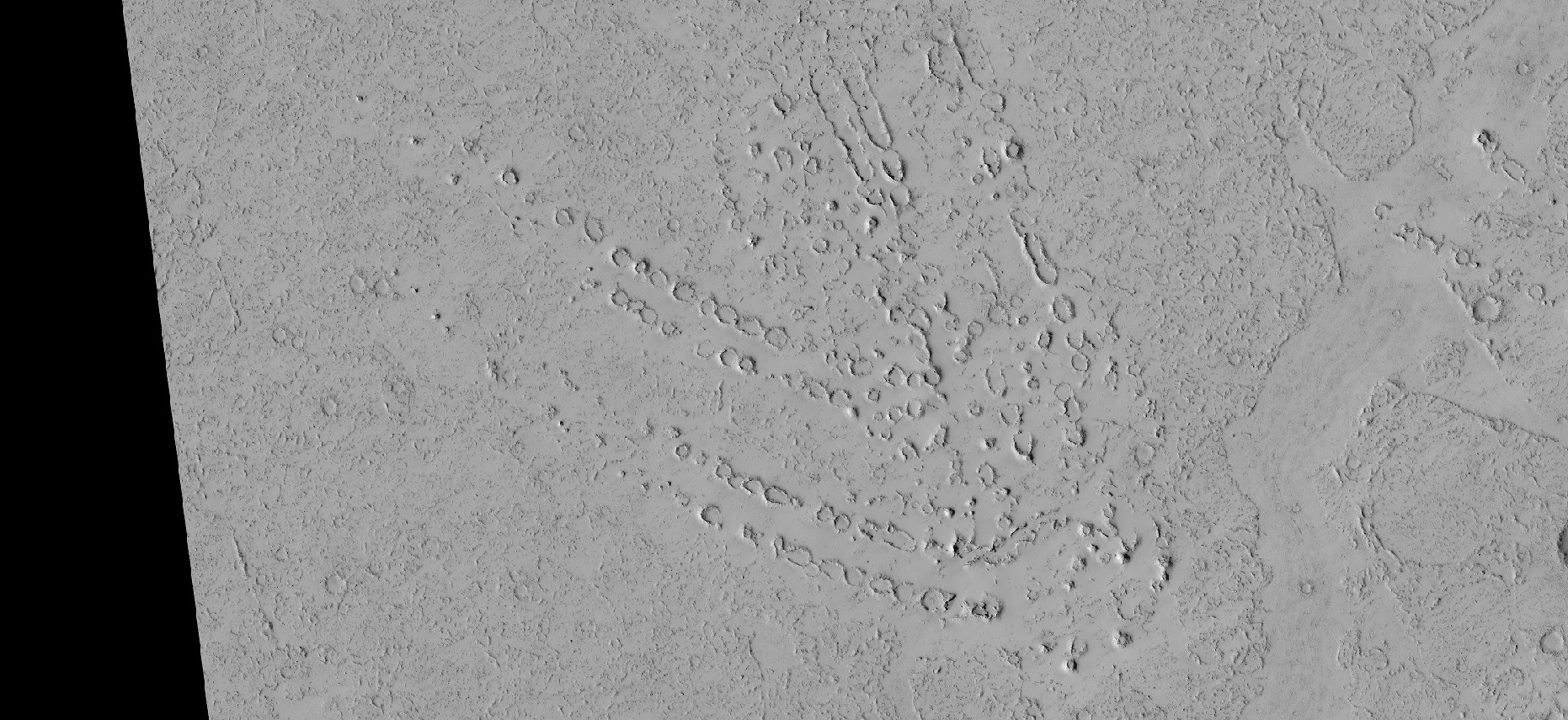
Rootless Cones, as seen by HiRISE under HiWish program. These group of rings or cones are thought to be caused by lava flowing over water ice or ground containing water ice. The ice quickly changes to steam which blows out a ring or cone. Here the kink in the chain may have been caused by the lava changing direction.

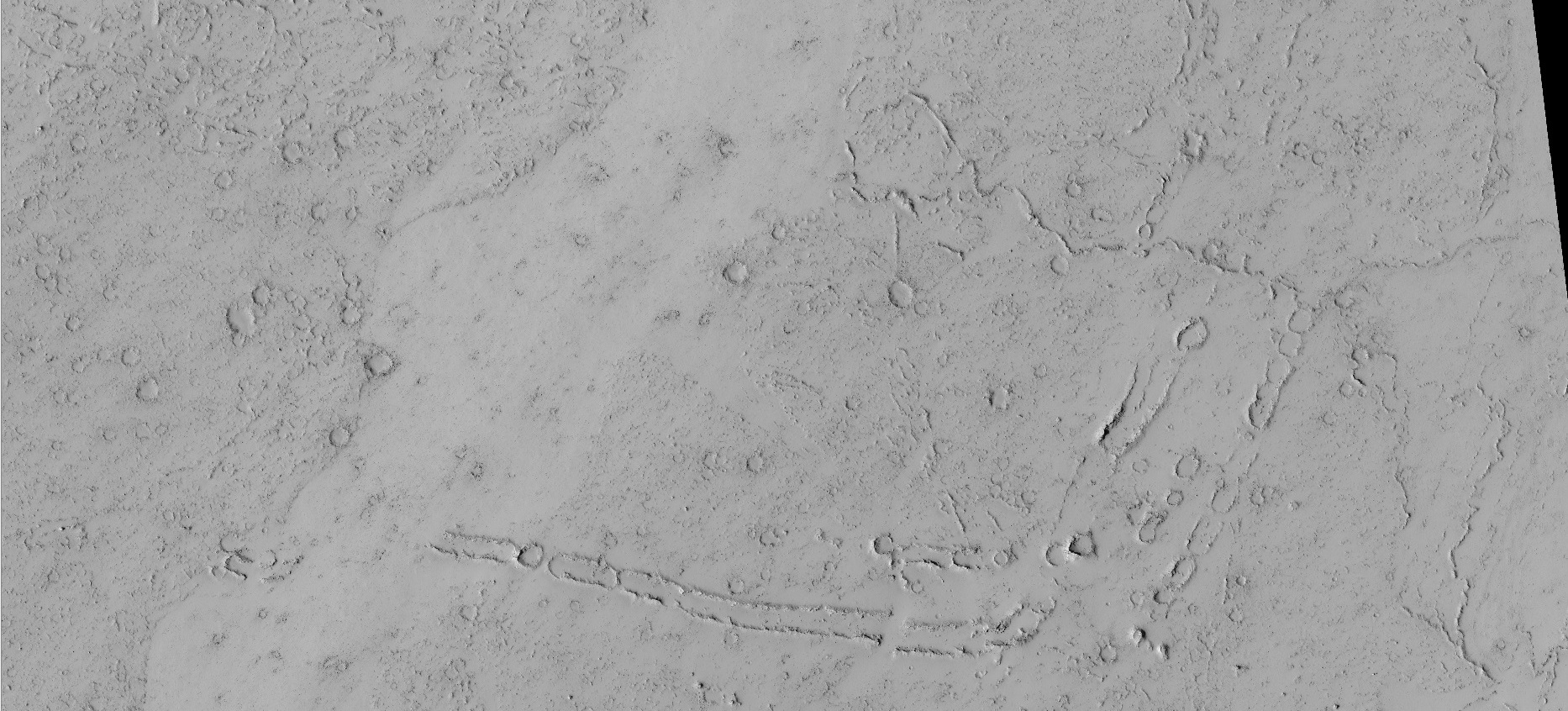
Rootless Cones, as seen by HiRISE under HiWish program. These group of rings or cones are suspected to be caused by lava flowing over water ice or ground containing water ice. The ice quickly changes to steam which blows out a ring or cone. Here the kink in the chain may have been caused by the lava changing direction. Some of the forms do not have the shape of rings or cones because maybe the lava moved too quickly; thereby not allowing a complete cone shape to form.

== Columnar jointing ==
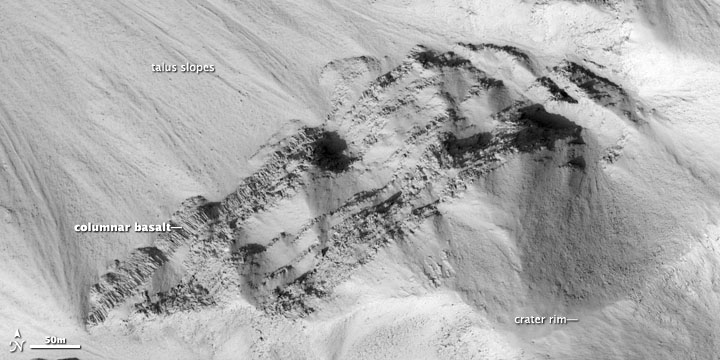
Columnar jointing in basalt, Marte Vallis

In 2009, HiRISE discovered columnar jointing in rocks on Mars. Such jointing is accepted as having involved water. To make the parallel cracks of columnar jointing, more cooling is necessary, and water is the most logical choice. Scientists calculate that the water was present intermittently for a few months to a few years.

== Light-toned layered deposits ==
HiRISE has sent back many images of large surface areas that are termed "light-toned layered deposits". These 30–80 meter thick deposits are thought to have been formed from the action of water. They contain evidence of stream channel systems. Furthermore, chemical data from the Compact Reconnaissance Imaging Spectrometer orbiting the planet have shown water related mineral forms: opal (hydrated silica) and iron sulfates. These can be formed from the action of low temperature acid solutions reacting with basaltic rocks. These features of light-toned layered deposits strongly suggest that there was long lasting precipitation and surface runoff during the Hesperian epoch of Martian history.

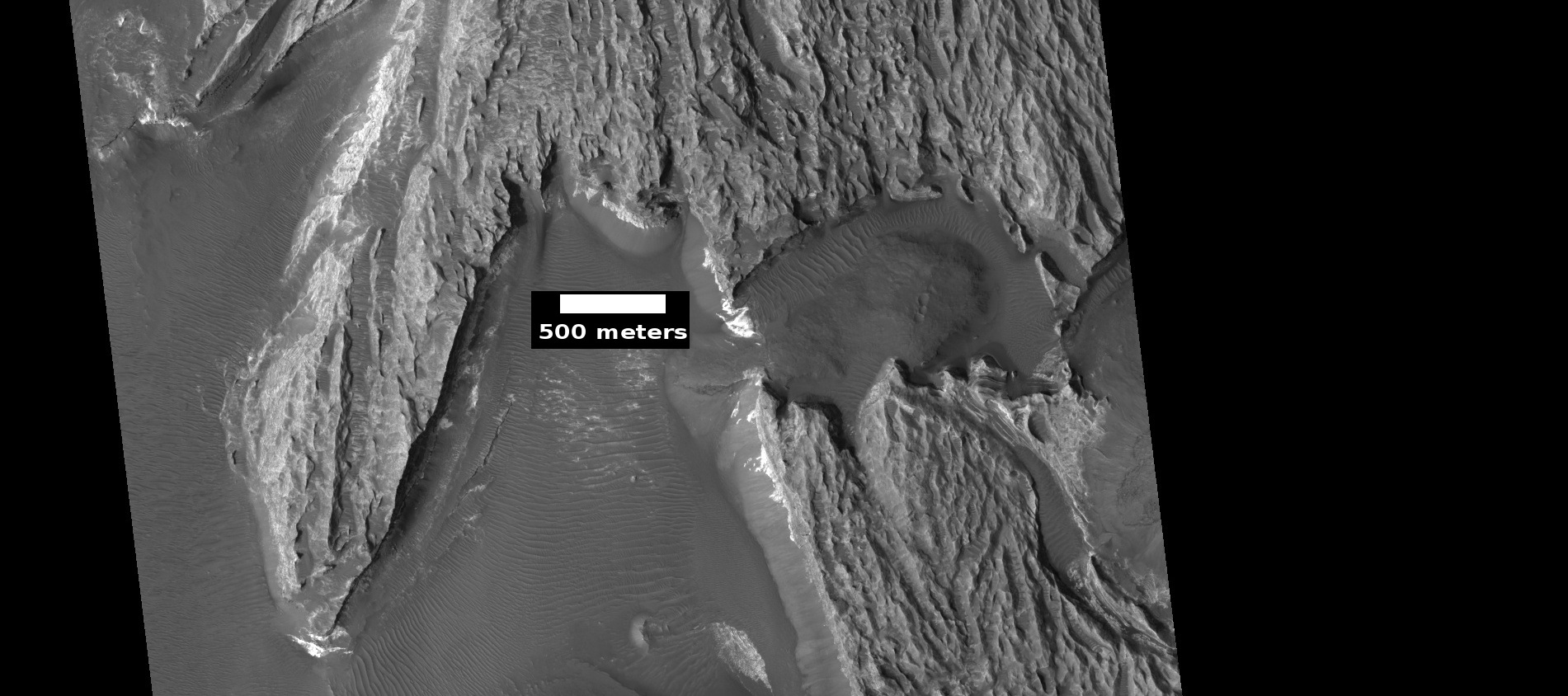
Light-toned deposit in Arsinoes Chaos, as seen by HiRISE under HiWish program.

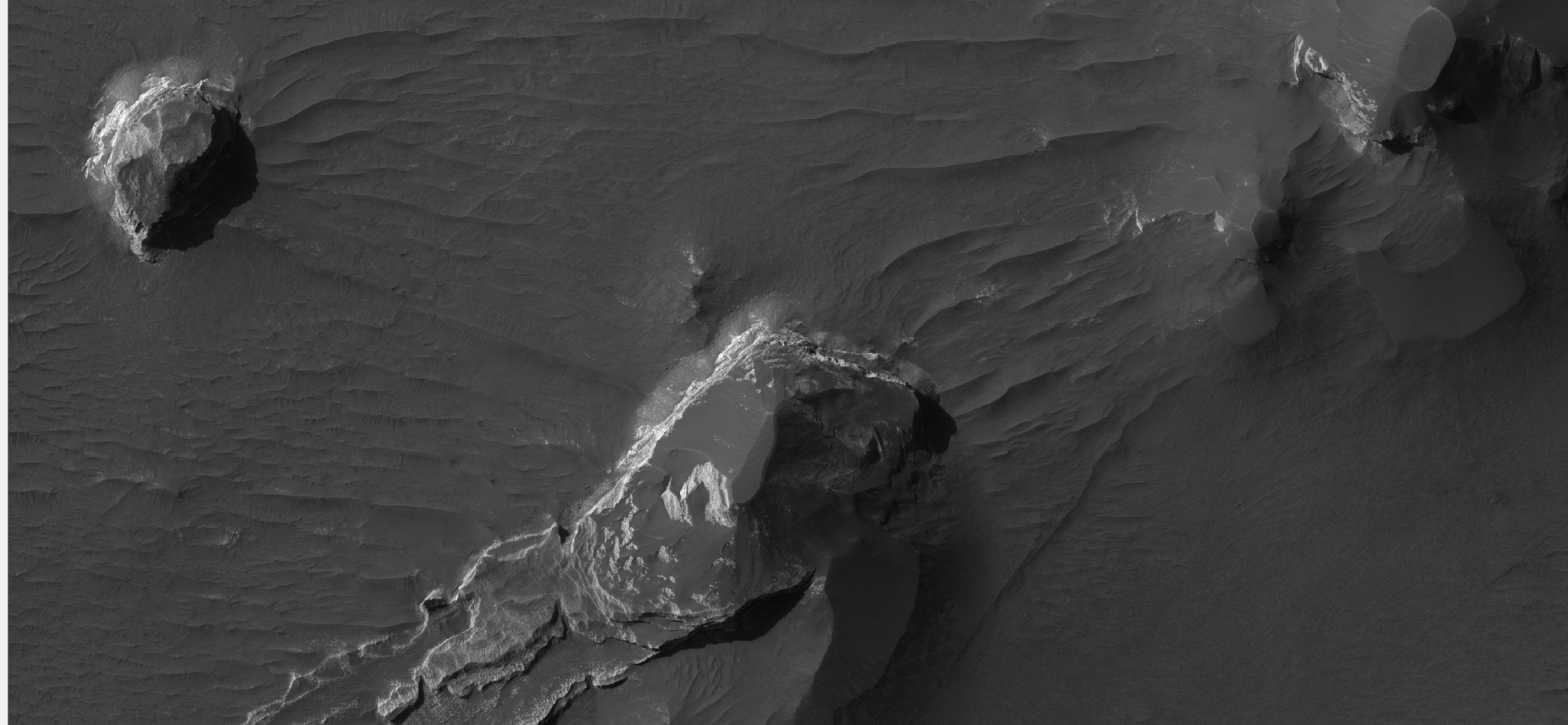
Butte in Arsinoes Chaos with some light-toned layers, as seen by HiRISE under HiWish program.

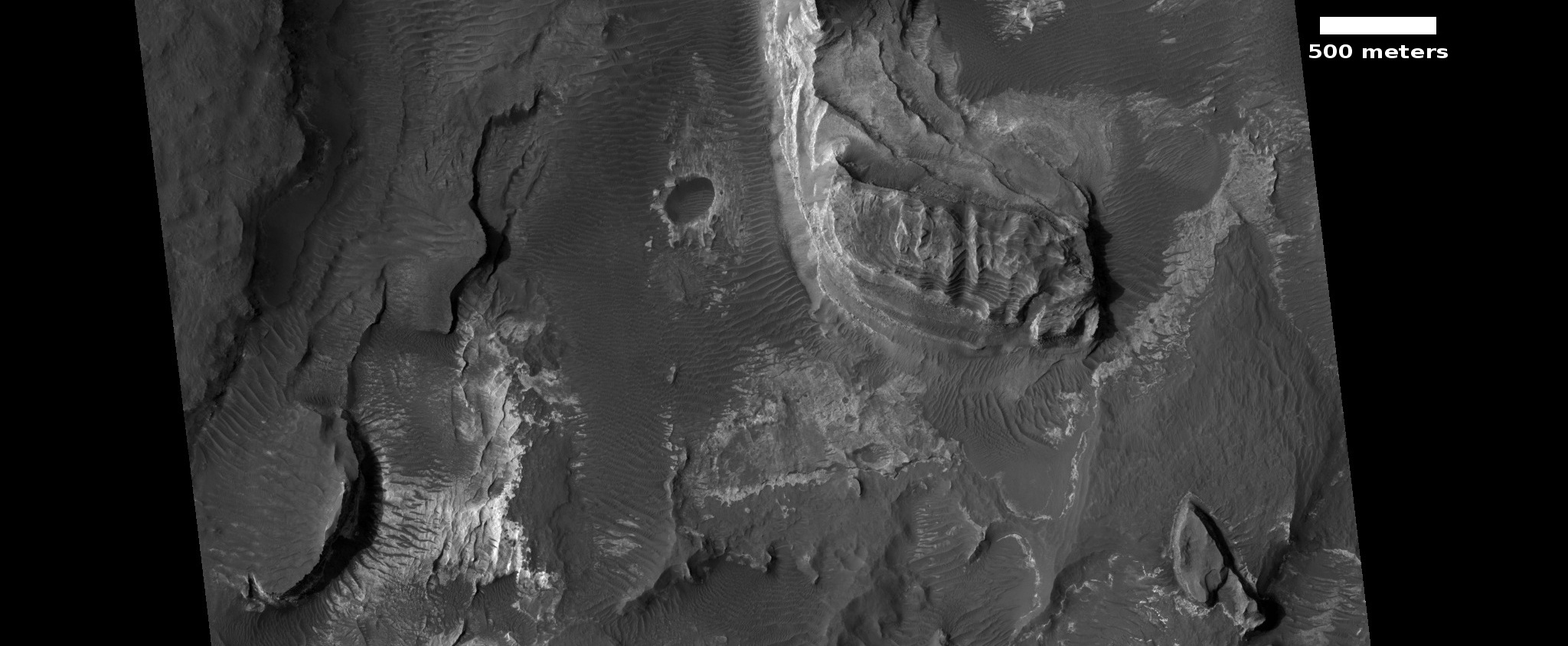
Layered butte in Aureum Chaos, as seen by HiRISE under HiWish program.

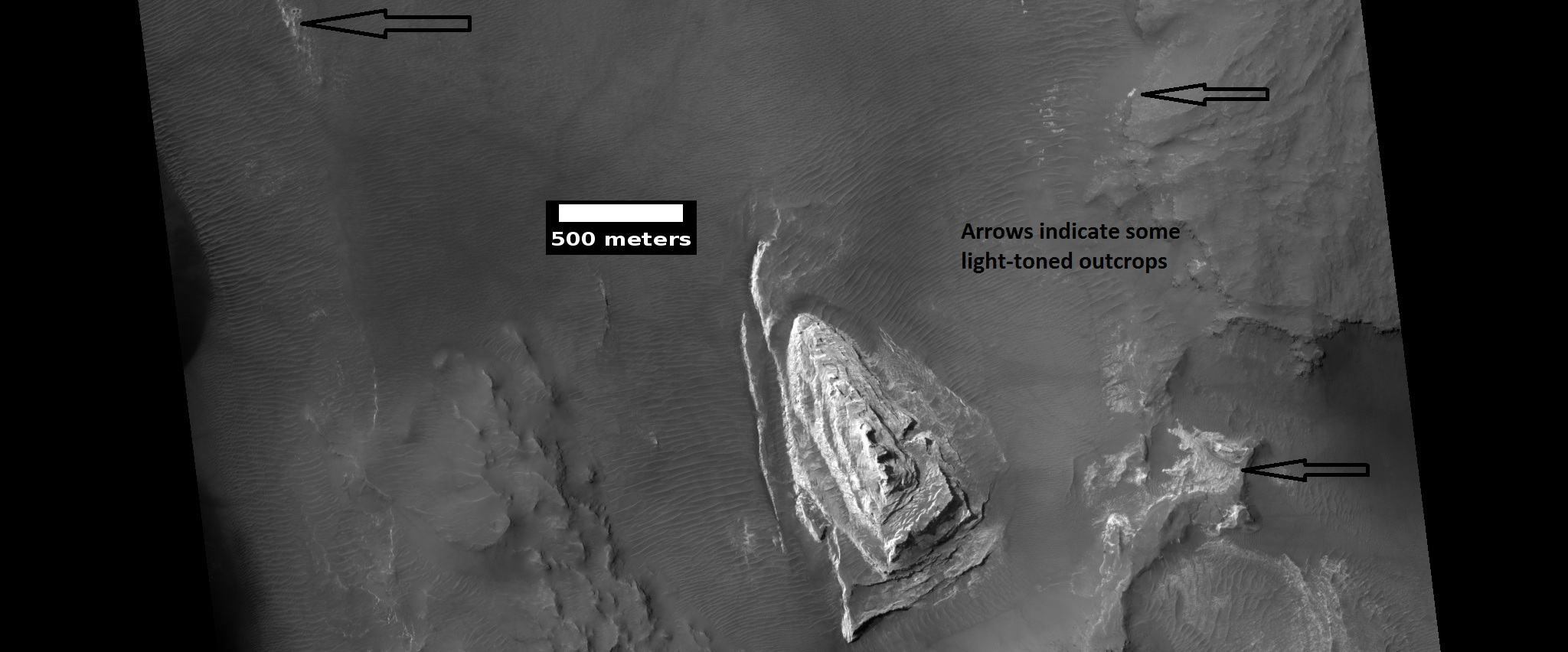
Light toned butte on floor of crater, as seen by HiRISE under HiWish program. Arrows show outcrops of light toned material. Light toned material is probably sulfate-rich and similar to material examined by Spirit rover, and it once probably covered the whole floor.

== See also ==
- Seasonal flows on warm Martian slopes
- Climate of Mars
- CRISM
- Eridania Lake
- Evidence of water on Mars from Mars Odyssey
- Geology of Mars
- Glacier
- Glaciers on Mars
- Lakes on Mars
- Martian gullies
- Ring mold craters
- Water on Mars
