= Miniature inertial measurement unit =

MIMU exploded view

Miniature inertial measurement unit (MIMU) is an inertial measurement unit (IMU) developed and built by Honeywell International to control and stabilize spacecraft during mission operations. MIMUs can also be configured to perform as an inertial reference unit (IRU). MIMUs have been flown on GEO, Low Earth orbit (LEO), planetary missions and deep-space-probe applications.

== Missions ==
=== Geostationary (GEO) missions ===
- Spacebus

=== Low-Earth orbiting (LEO) Missions ===
- Defense Meteorological Satellite Program (DMSP)

=== Planetary missions ===
- Mars Reconnaissance Orbiter – launched in 2005 on a mission to study the planet Mars
- STEREO – launched in 2006 on a mission to study the Sun
- Lunar Reconnaissance Orbiter – launched in 2009 on a mission to study the Moon

=== Deep-space-probe missions ===
- New Horizons – launched in 2006 on a mission to study the planet Pluto
