= Mars Reconnaissance Orbiter =

NASA spacecraft active since 2005

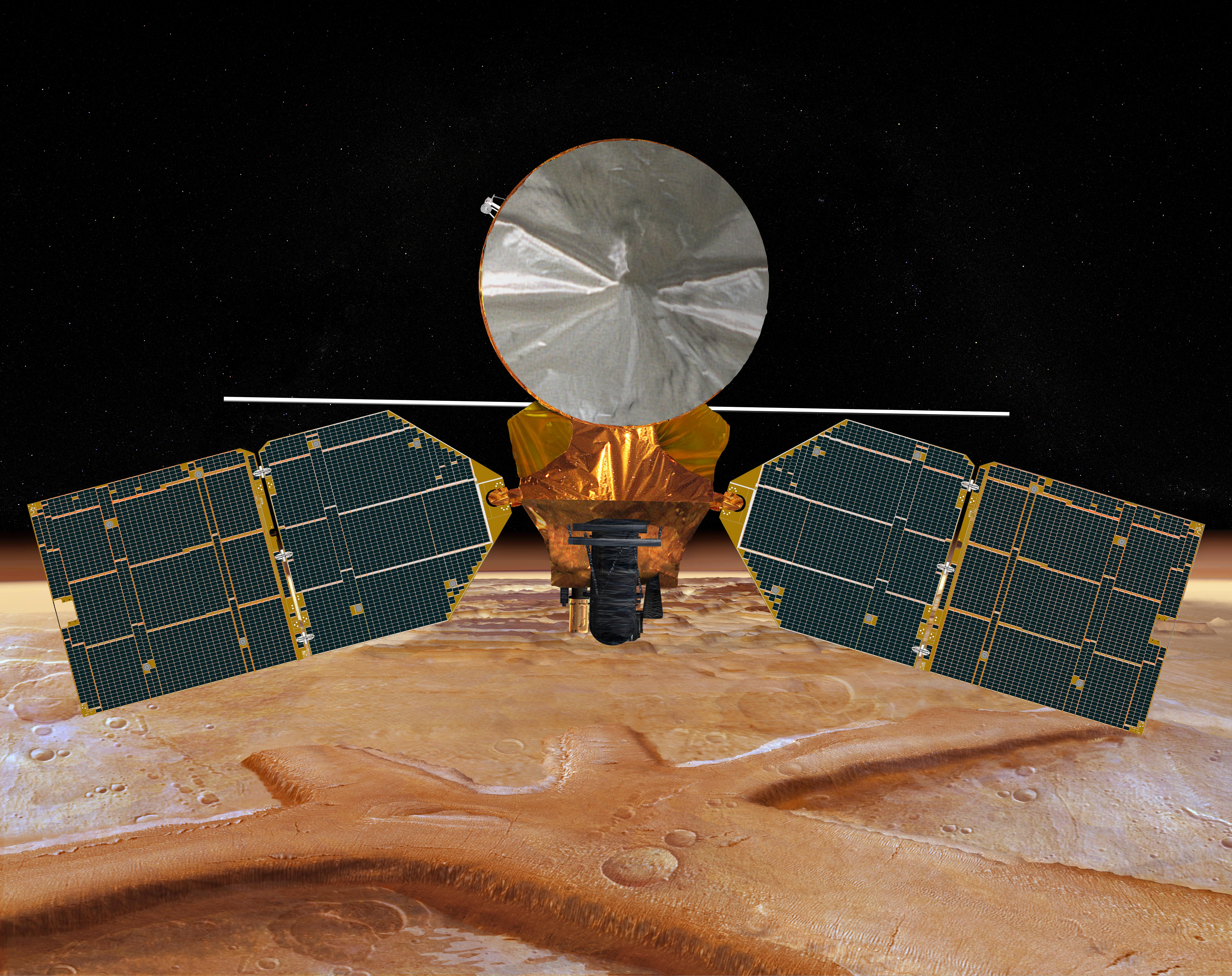
- Mars Reconnaissance Orbiter spacecraft
- Mission type: Mars orbiter
- Operator: NASA / Jet Propulsion Laboratory
- COSPAR ID: 2005-029A
- SATCAT no.: 28788
- Website: mars.nasa.gov/mro/ nasa.gov/mission_pages/MRO/main/index.html
- Mission duration: 21 years, 1 month and 25 days from launch (20 years, 6 months and 27 days (7315 sols) at Mars)

Spacecraft properties
- Manufacturer: Lockheed Martin / University of Arizona / Applied Physics Laboratory / Italian Space Agency / Malin Space Science Systems
- Launch mass: 2,180 kg (4,810 lb)
- Dry mass: 1,031 kg (2,273 lb)
- Payload mass: 139 kg (306 lb)
- Power: 600–2000 watts

Start of mission
- Launch date: August 12, 2005, 11:43:00 UTC
- Rocket: Atlas V 401
- Launch site: Cape Canaveral SLC-41
- Contractor: Lockheed Martin

Orbital parameters
- Reference system: Areocentric
- Regime: Sun-synchronous
- Inclination: 93 degrees
- Period: 111 minutes

Mars orbiter
- Orbital insertion: March 10, 2006, 21:24:00 UTC; MSD 46990 12:48 AMT
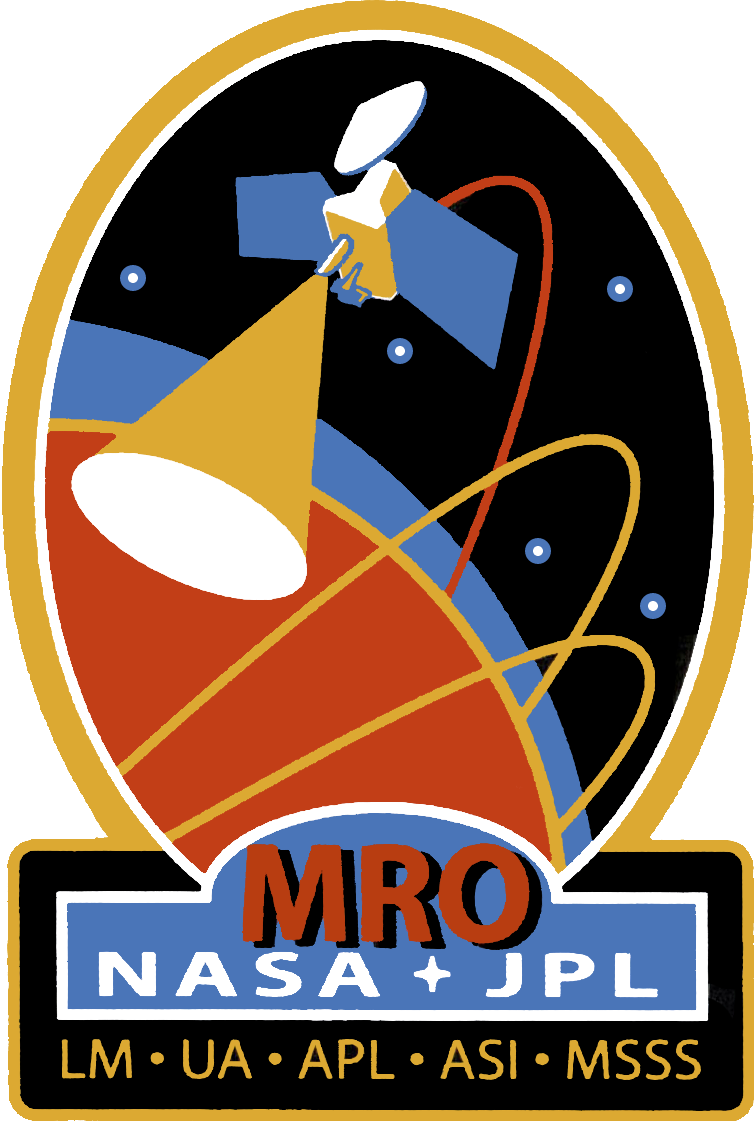
- Official insignia of the Mars Reconnaissance Orbiter mission Mars Exploration Program

The Mars Reconnaissance Orbiter (MRO) is a spacecraft designed to search for the existence of water on Mars and provide support for missions to Mars, as part of NASA's Mars Exploration Program. It was launched from Cape Canaveral on August 12, 2005, at 11:43 UTC and reached Mars on March 10, 2006, at 21:24 UTC. In November 2006, after six months of aerobraking, it entered its final science orbit and began its primary science phase.

Mission objectives include observing the climate of Mars, investigating geologic forces, providing reconnaissance of future landing sites, and relaying data from surface missions back to Earth. To support these objectives, the MRO carries different scientific instruments, including three cameras, two spectrometers and a subsurface radar. As of July 29, 2023, the MRO has returned over 450 terabits of data, helped choose safe landing sites for NASA's Mars landers, and discovered pure water ice in new craters and further evidence that water once flowed on the surface on Mars.

The spacecraft continues to operate at Mars, far beyond its intended design life. Due to its critical role as a high-speed data-relay for ground missions, NASA intends to continue the mission as long as possible, at least through the late 2020s. As of October 7, 2026, the MRO has been active at Mars for 7315 sols, or 20 years, 6 months and 27 days, and is the third longest-lived spacecraft to orbit Mars, after 2001 Mars Odyssey and Mars Express.

== Pre-launch ==
After the failures of the Mars Climate Orbiter and the Mars Polar Lander missions in 1999, NASA reorganized and replanned its Mars Exploration Program. In October 2000, NASA announced its reformulated Mars plans, which reduced the number of planned missions and introduced a new theme, "follow the water". The plans included the Mars Reconnaissance Orbiter (MRO), to be launched in 2005.

On October 3, 2001, NASA chose Lockheed Martin as the primary contractor for the spacecraft's fabrication. By the end of 2001 all of the mission's instruments were selected. There were no major setbacks during the MRO's construction, and the spacecraft arrived at John F. Kennedy Space Center on April 30, 2005, for launch preparations.

== Mission objectives ==
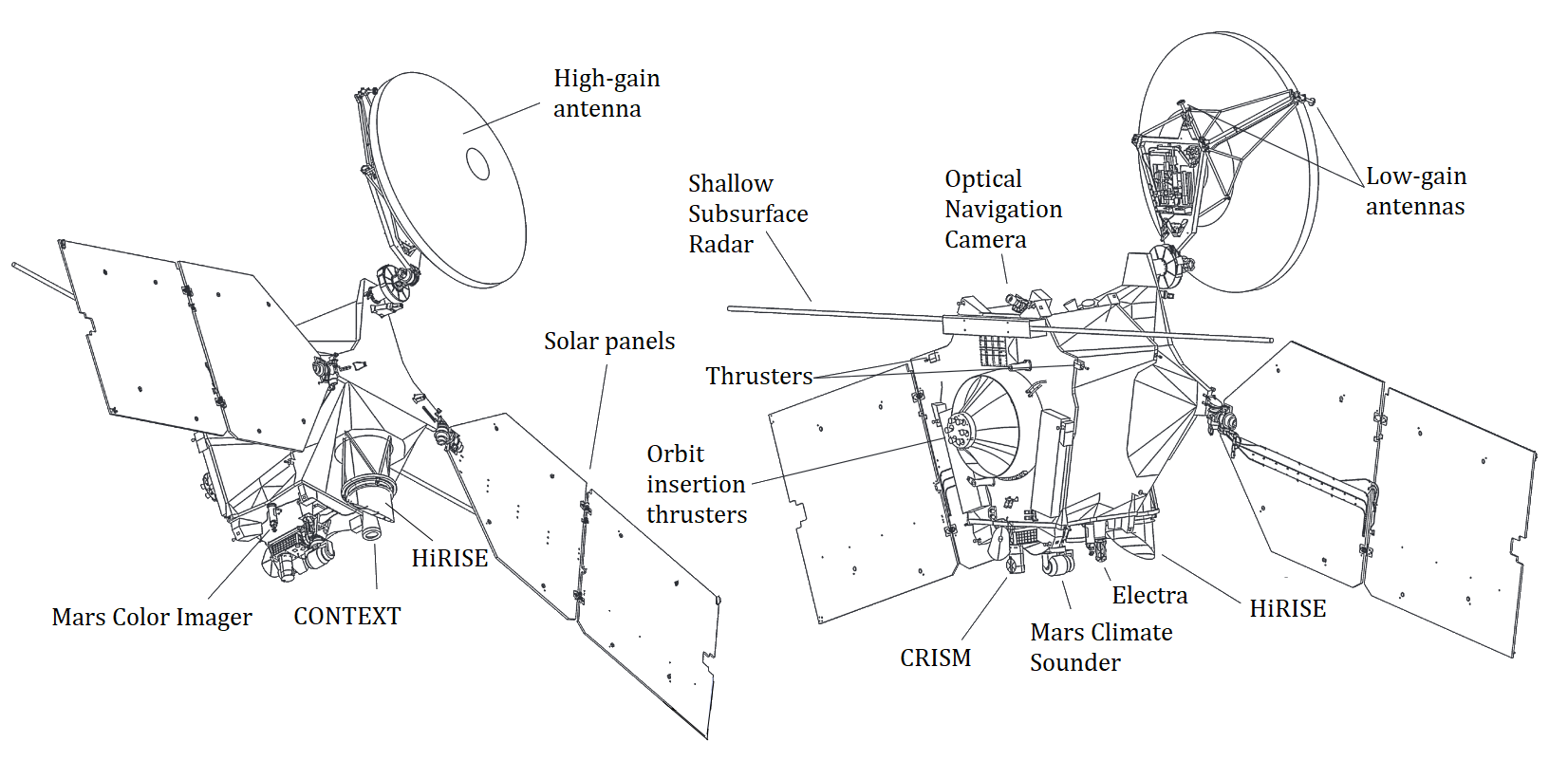
Components of MRO

MRO has both scientific and "mission support" objectives which were carried out during the mission's phases. The Primary Science Phase lasted until November 2008, at which time NASA declared the mission a success. The Extended Science Phase, lasting from 2008 to 2010, was initially planned to support the Phoenix lander and the Mars Science Laboratory, but they were uncontactable and delayed respectively, freeing up the MRO to further study Mars.After 2010, the mission consisted of Extended Mission (EM) phases, each lasting two years up to EM4, and three years from then on. As of 2024, the MRO is on its 6th extended mission.

The formal science objectives of MRO are to observe the present climate, particularly its atmospheric circulation and seasonal variations; search for signs of water, both past and present, and understand how it altered the planet's surface; map and characterize the geological forces that shaped the surface.

To support other missions to Mars, the MRO also has mission support objectives. They are to provide data relay services from ground missions back to Earth, characterize the safety and feasibility of potential future landing sites and Mars rover traverses, and capture data from the entry, descent and landing phase of rovers.

MRO played a key role in choosing safe landing sites for the Phoenix lander in 2008, Mars Science Laboratory / Curiosity rover in 2012, InSight lander in 2018, and the Mars 2020 / Perseverance rover in 2021.

== Launch and orbital insertion ==
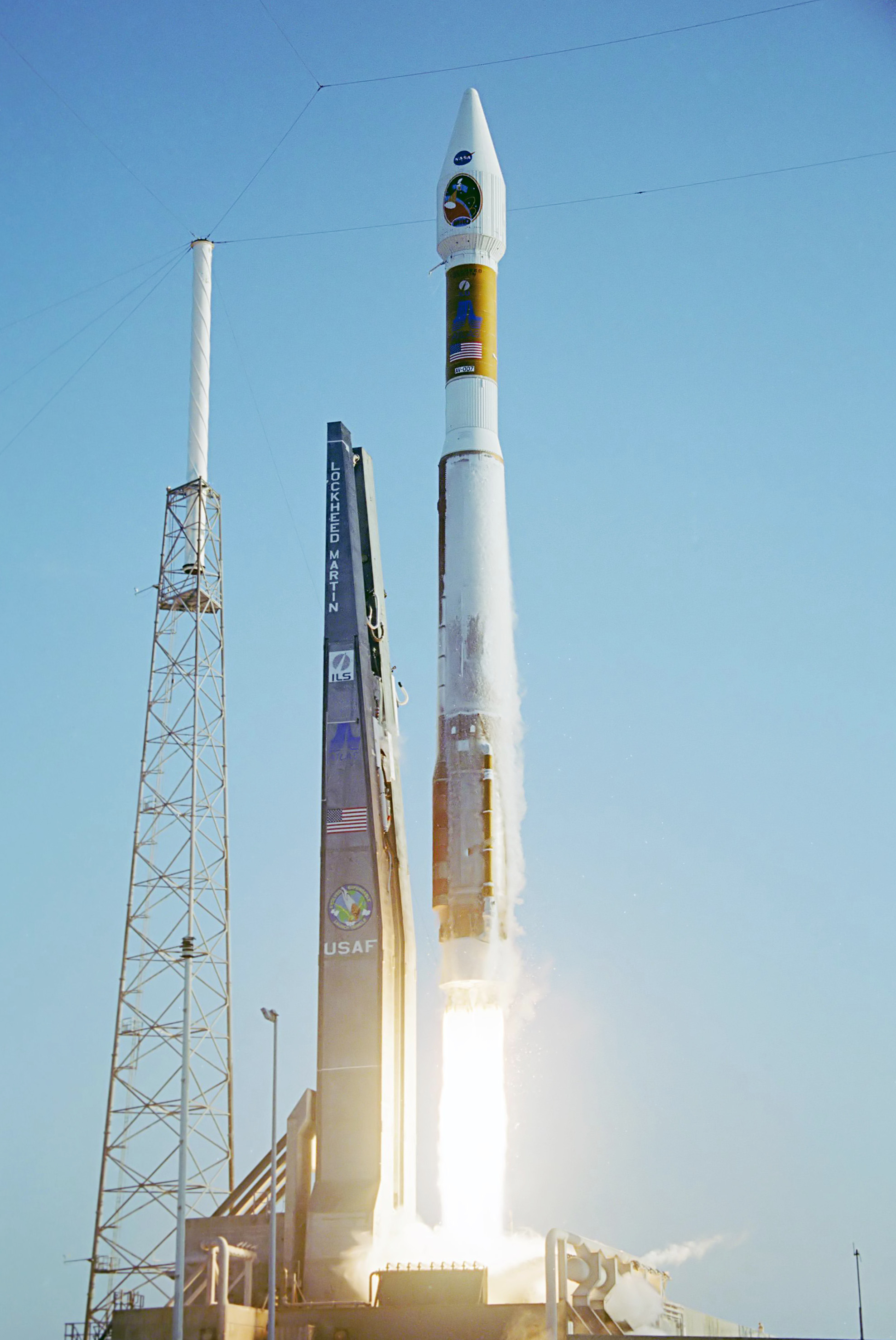
Launch of Atlas V carrying the MRO, 11:43:00 UTC August 12, 2005

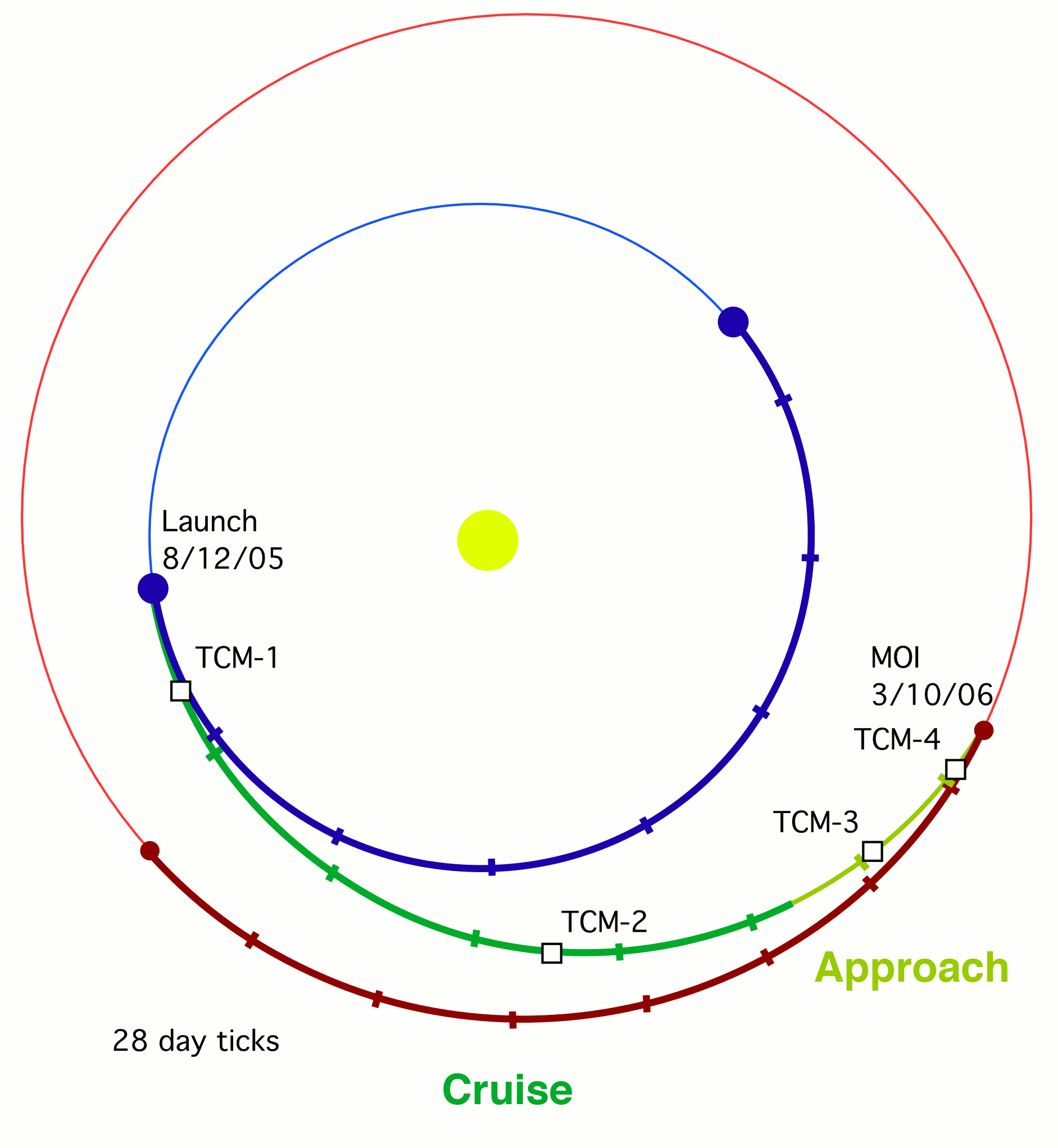
Transfer orbit from Earth to Mars. TCM-1 to TCM-4 denote the planned trajectory correction maneuvers.

Animation of MRO's trajectory around Mars from March 10, 2006, to September 30, 2007
MRO · Mars

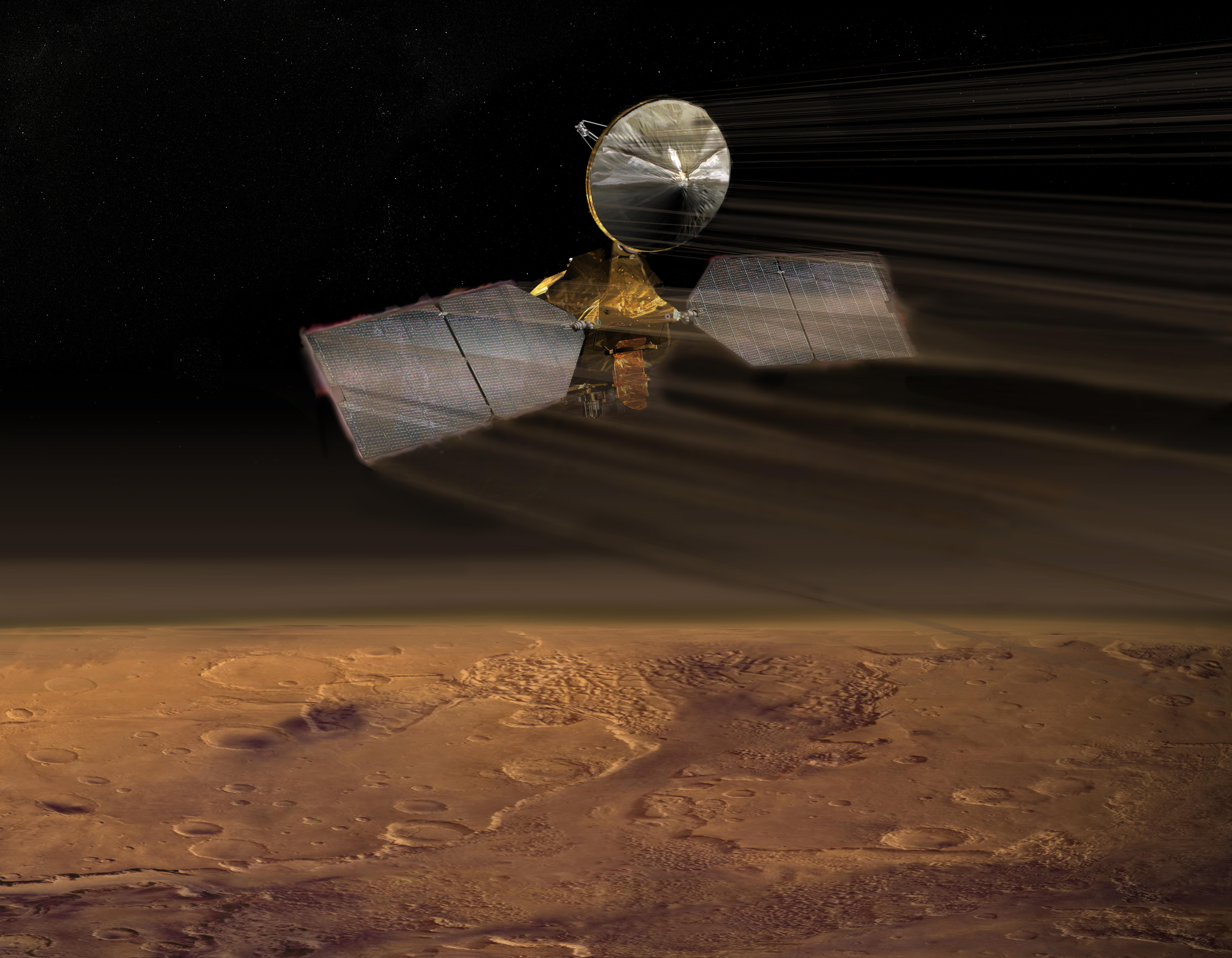
Artwork of MRO aerobraking

On August 12, 2005, MRO was launched aboard an Atlas V-401 rocket from Space Launch Complex 41 at Cape Canaveral Air Force Station. The Centaur upper stage of the rocket completed its burns over a 56-minute period and placed MRO into an interplanetary transfer orbit towards Mars.

MRO cruised through interplanetary space for seven and a half months before reaching Mars. While en route, most of the scientific instruments and experiments were tested and calibrated. To ensure proper orbital insertion upon reaching Mars, four trajectory correction maneuvers were planned and a fifth emergency maneuver was discussed. However, only three trajectory correction maneuvers were necessary, which saved 27 kilograms (60 lb) of fuel that would be usable during MRO's extended mission.

MRO began orbital insertion by approaching Mars on March 10, 2006, and passing above its southern hemisphere at an altitude of 370–400 kilometers (230–250 miles). All six of MRO's main engines burned for 27 minutes to slow the probe by 1,000 meters per second (3,300 ft/s). The burn was remarkably accurate, as the insertion route had been designed more than three months prior, with the achieved change in speed only 0.01% short from the design, necessitating an additional 35-second burn time.

Completion of the orbital insertion placed the orbiter in a highly elliptical polar orbit with a period of approximately 35.5 hours. Shortly after insertion, the periapsis – the point in the orbit closest to Mars – was 426 km (265 mi) from the surface (3,806 km (2,365 mi) from the planet's center). The apoapsis – the point in the orbit farthest from Mars – was 44,500 km (27,700 mi) from the surface (47,972 km (29,808 mi) from the planet's center).

When MRO entered orbit, it joined five other active spacecraft that were either in orbit or on the planet's surface: Mars Global Surveyor, Mars Express, 2001 Mars Odyssey, and the two Mars Exploration Rovers (Spirit and Opportunity). This set a new record for the most operational spacecraft in the immediate vicinity of Mars.

On March 30, 2006, MRO began the process of aerobraking, a three-step procedure that halved the fuel needed to achieve a lower, more circular orbit with a shorter period. First, during its first five orbits of the planet (one Earth week), MRO used its thrusters to drop the periapsis of its orbit into aerobraking altitude. Second, while using its thrusters to make minor corrections to its periapsis altitude, MRO maintained aerobraking altitude for 445 planetary orbits (about five Earth months) to reduce the apoapsis of the orbit to 450 kilometers (280 mi). This was done in such a way so as to not heat the spacecraft too much, but also dip enough into the atmosphere to slow the spacecraft down. Third, after the process was complete, MRO used its thrusters to move its periapsis out of the edge of the atmosphere on August 30, 2006.

In September 2006, MRO fired its thrusters twice more to adjust its final, nearly circular orbit to approximately 250 to 316 km (155 to 196 mi) above the surface, with a period of about 112 minutes and a polar inclination of around 93°. The SHARAD radar antennas were deployed on September 16. All of the scientific instruments were tested and most were turned off prior to the solar conjunction that occurred from October 7 to November 6, 2006. This was done to prevent charged particles from the Sun from interfering with signals and potentially endangering the spacecraft. After the conjunction ended the "primary science phase" began.

== Timeline ==
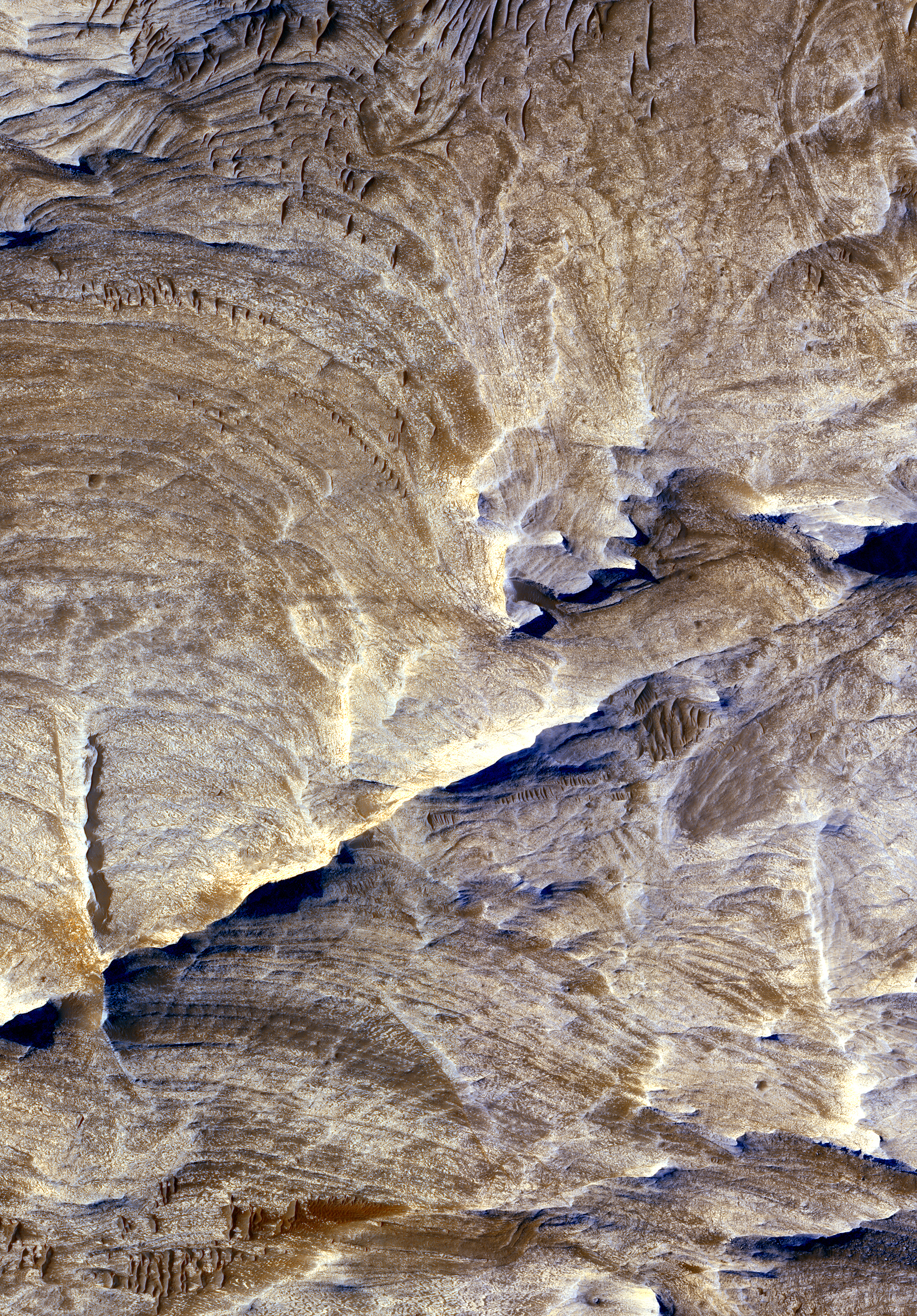
Tectonic fractures within the Candor Chasma region of Valles Marineris, Mars, retain ridge-like shapes as the surrounding bedrock erodes away.

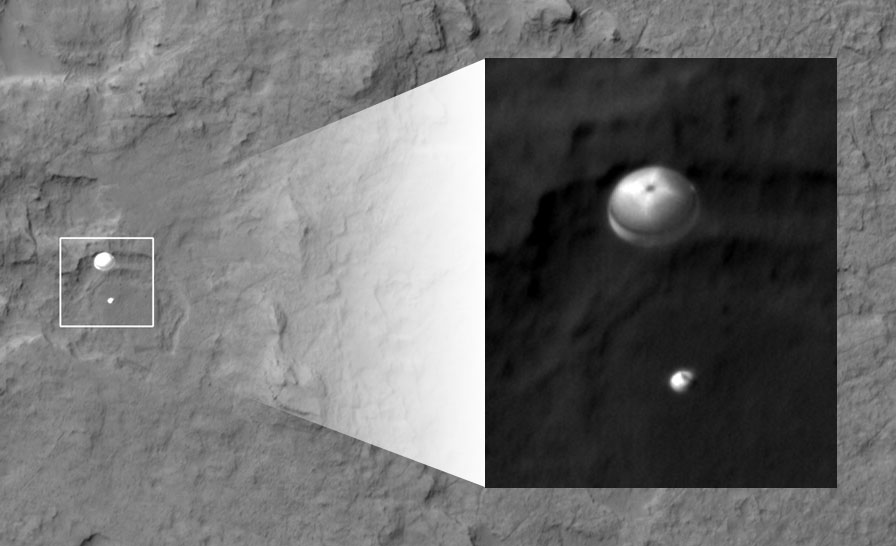
The Curiosity rover during atmospheric entry as seen by HiRISE on August 6, 2012. Supersonic parachute and backshell visible

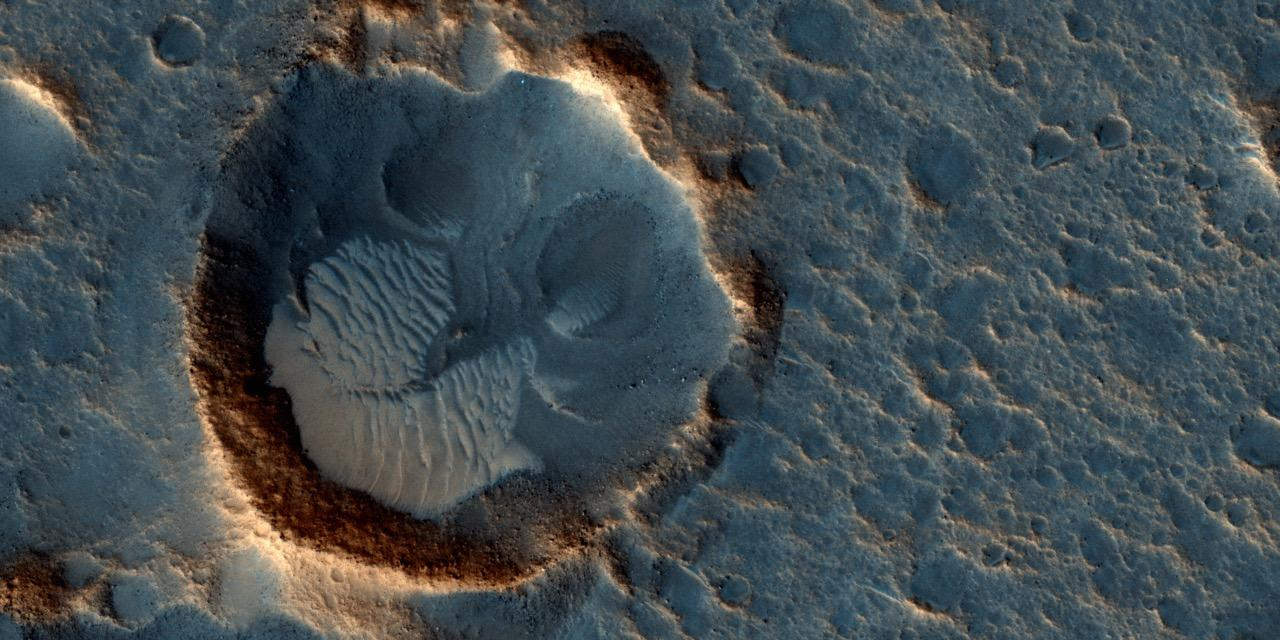
Image taken by HiRISE of Acidalia Planitia on May 17, 2015, where the novel The Martian and its film adaptation take place

Comparison of Mars with and without the dust storm that caused the end of the Opportunity rover, taken by MARCI in 2018

On September 29, 2006 (sol 402), MRO took its first high resolution image from its science orbit. This image is said to resolve items as small as 90 cm (3 feet) in diameter. On October 6, NASA released detailed pictures from the MRO of Victoria crater along with the Opportunity rover on the rim above it. In November, problems began to surface in the operation of two MRO spacecraft instruments. A stepping mechanism in the Mars Climate Sounder (MCS) skipped on multiple occasions resulting in a field of view that was slightly out of position. By December, normal operations of the instrument had been suspended, although a mitigation strategy allows the instrument to continue making most of its intended observations. Also, an increase in noise and resulting bad pixels has been observed in several CCDs of the High Resolution Imaging Science Experiment (HiRISE). Operation of this camera with a longer warm-up time (Note: Due to the coldness of space, spacecraft instruments need to be "warmed up" to operate properly.) has alleviated the issue. However, the cause is still unknown and may return.

On November 17, 2006, NASA announced the successful test of the MRO as an orbital communications relay. Using the NASA rover Spirit as the point of origin for the transmission, the MRO acted as a relay for transmitting data back to Earth. HiRISE was able to photograph the Phoenix lander during its parachuted descent to Vastitas Borealis on May 25, 2008 (sol 990).

The orbiter continued to experience recurring problems in 2009, including four spontaneous resets, culminating in a four-month shut-down of the spacecraft from August to December. Though engineers were not able to determine the cause of the recurrent resets, they suspected a piece of electronics had been affected by radiation. While investigating, the engineers discovered and fixed a flaw that could have deleted all critical information onboard the MRO. Another spontaneous reset occurred in September 2010.

On March 3, 2010, the MRO passed another significant milestone, having transmitted over 100 terabits of data back to Earth, which was more than all other interplanetary probes sent from Earth combined.

In December 2010, the first Extended Mission began. Goals included exploring seasonal processes, searching for surface changes, and providing support for other Martian spacecraft. This lasted until October 2012, after which NASA started the MRO's second Extended Mission, which lasted until October 2014. As of 2023, the MRO has completed five missions, and is currently on its sixth.

On August 6, 2012 (sol 2483), the orbiter passed over Gale crater, the landing site of the Mars Science Laboratory mission, during its EDL phase. It captured an image via the HiRISE camera of the Curiosity rover descending with its backshell and supersonic parachute. In December 2014 and April 2015, Curiosity was photographed again by HiRISE inside Gale Crater.

Another computer anomaly occurred on March 9, 2014, when the MRO put itself into safe mode after an unscheduled swap from one computer to another. The MRO resumed normal science operations four days later. This occurred again on April 11, 2015, after which the MRO returned to full operational capabilities a week later.

NASA reported that the MRO, as well as the Mars Odyssey Orbiter and MAVEN orbiter had a chance to study the Comet Siding Spring flyby on October 19, 2014. To minimize risk of damage from the material shed by the comet, the MRO made orbital adjustments on July 2, 2014, and August 27, 2014. During the flyby, the MRO took the best ever pictures of a comet from the Oort cloud and was not damaged.

In January 2015, the MRO discovered and identified the wreckage of Britain's Beagle 2, which was lost during its landing phase in 2003 and was thought to have crashed. The images revealed that Beagle 2 had actually landed safely, but one or two of its solar panels had failed to fully deploy, which blocked the radio antenna. In October 2016, the crash site of another lost spacecraft, Schiaparelli EDM, was photographed by the MRO, using both the CTX and HiRISE cameras.

On July 29, 2015, the MRO was placed into a new orbit to provide communications support during the anticipated arrival of the InSight Mars lander mission in September 2016. The maneuver's engine burn lasted for 75 seconds. InSight was delayed and missed the 2016 launch window, but was successfully launched during the next window on May 5, 2018, and landed on November 26, 2018.

Due to the longevity of the mission, a number of MRO components have started deteriorating. From the start of the mission in 2005 to 2017, the MRO had used a miniature inertial measurement unit (MIMU) for altitude and orientation control. After 58,000 hours of use, and limited signs of life, the orbiter switched over to a backup, which, as of 2018, has reached 52,000 hours of use. To conserve the life of the backup, NASA switched from MIMUs to an "all-stellar" mode for routine operations in 2018. The "all-stellar" mode uses cameras and pattern recognition software to determine the location of stars, which can then be used to identify the MRO's orientation. Problems with blurring in pictures from HiRISE and battery degradation also arose in 2017 but have since been resolved. In August 2023, electronic units within the HiRISE's CCD RED4 sensor began to fail as well, and are causing visual artifacts in pictures taken.

In 2017, the cryocoolers used by CRISM completed their lifecycle, limiting the instrument's capabilities to visible wavelengths, instead of its full wavelength range. In 2022, NASA announced the shutdown of CRISM in its entirety, and the instrument was formally retired on April 3, 2023, after creating two final, near global, maps using prior data and a more limited second spectrometer that did not require cryocoolers.

As of January 2024, the MRO has around 132 kg of fuel remaining, enough to support operations until 2035.

== Instruments ==
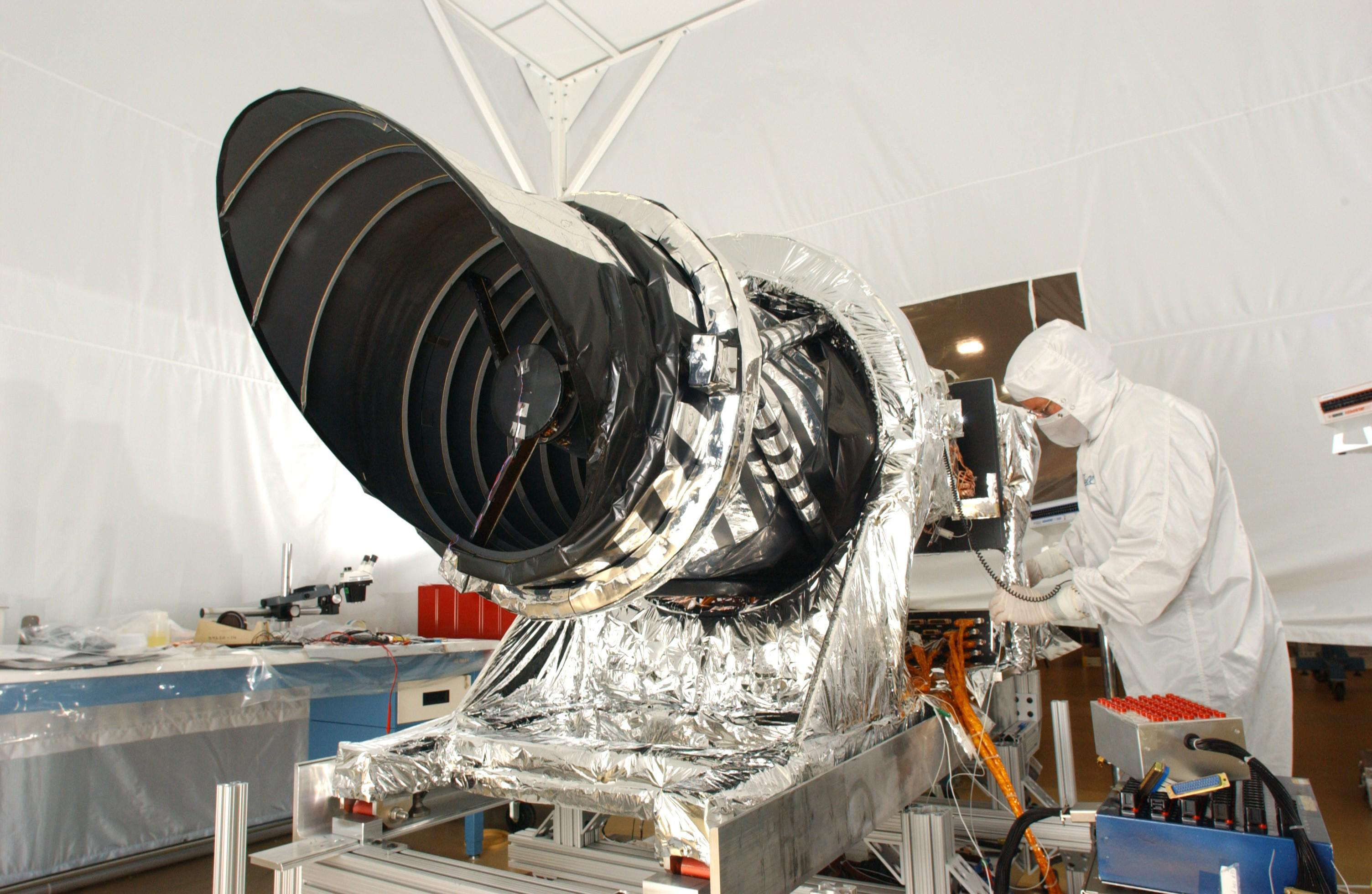
High Resolution Imaging Science Experiment (HiRISE)

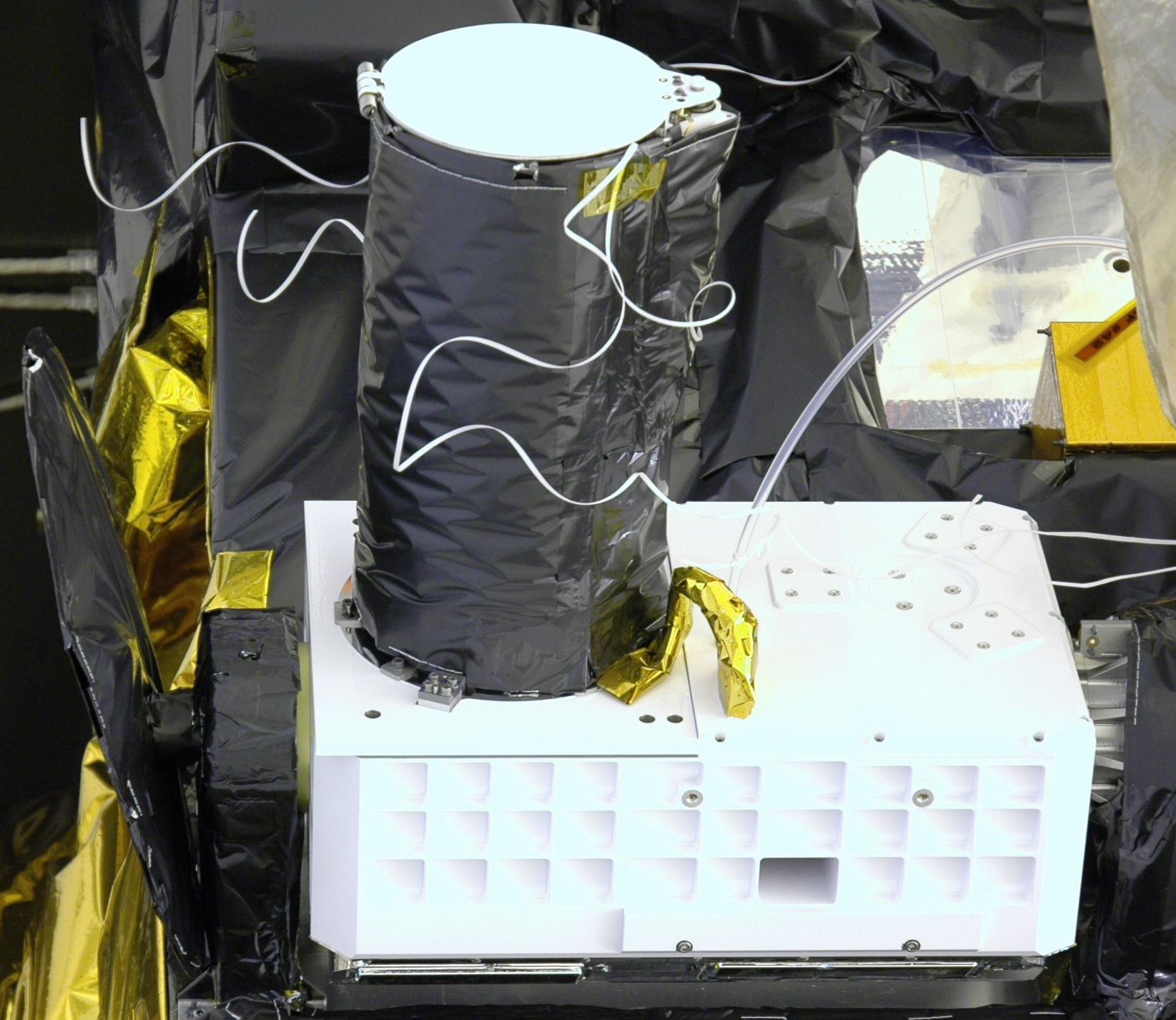
CRISM

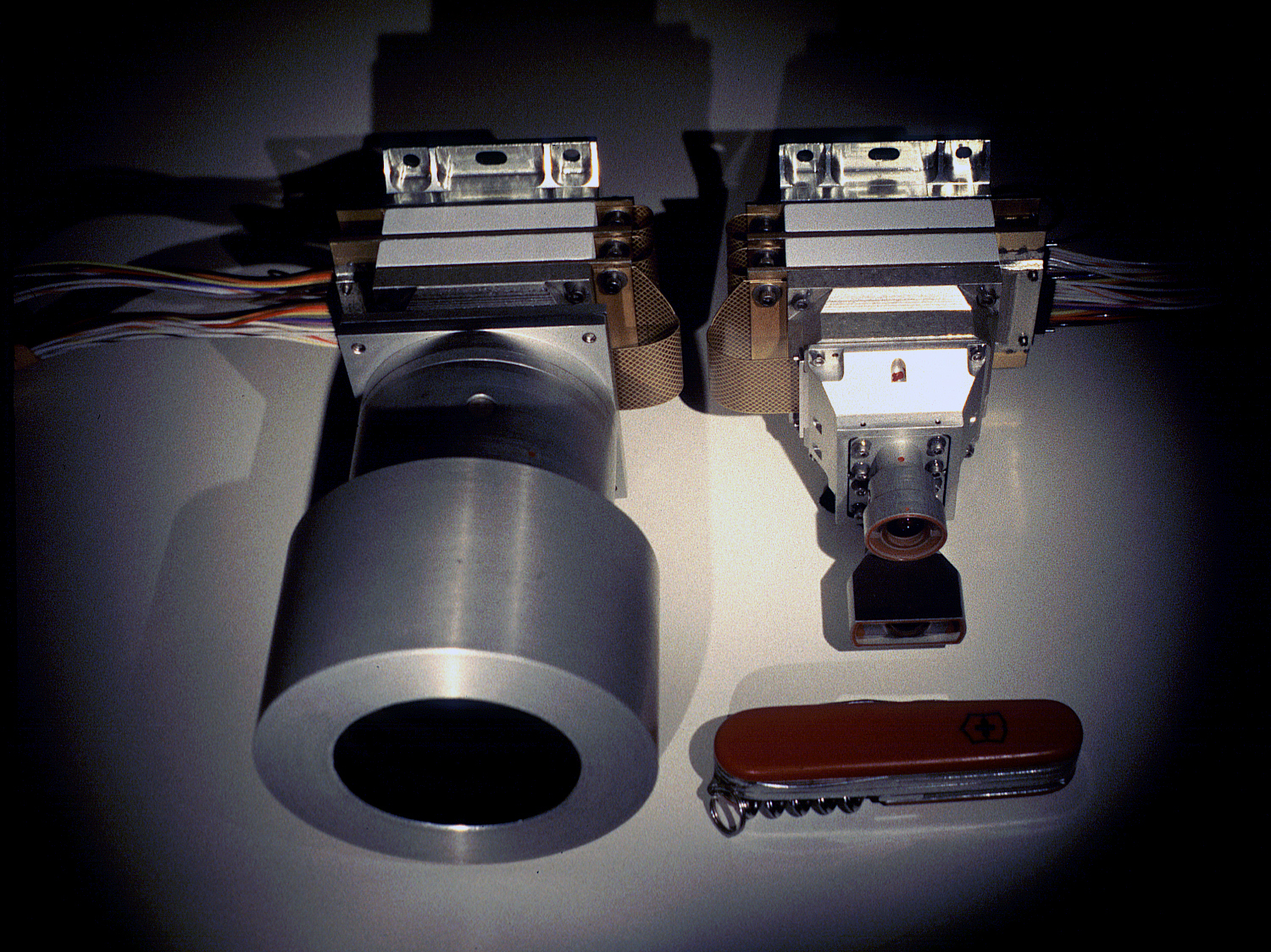
Mars Color Imager (MARCI)

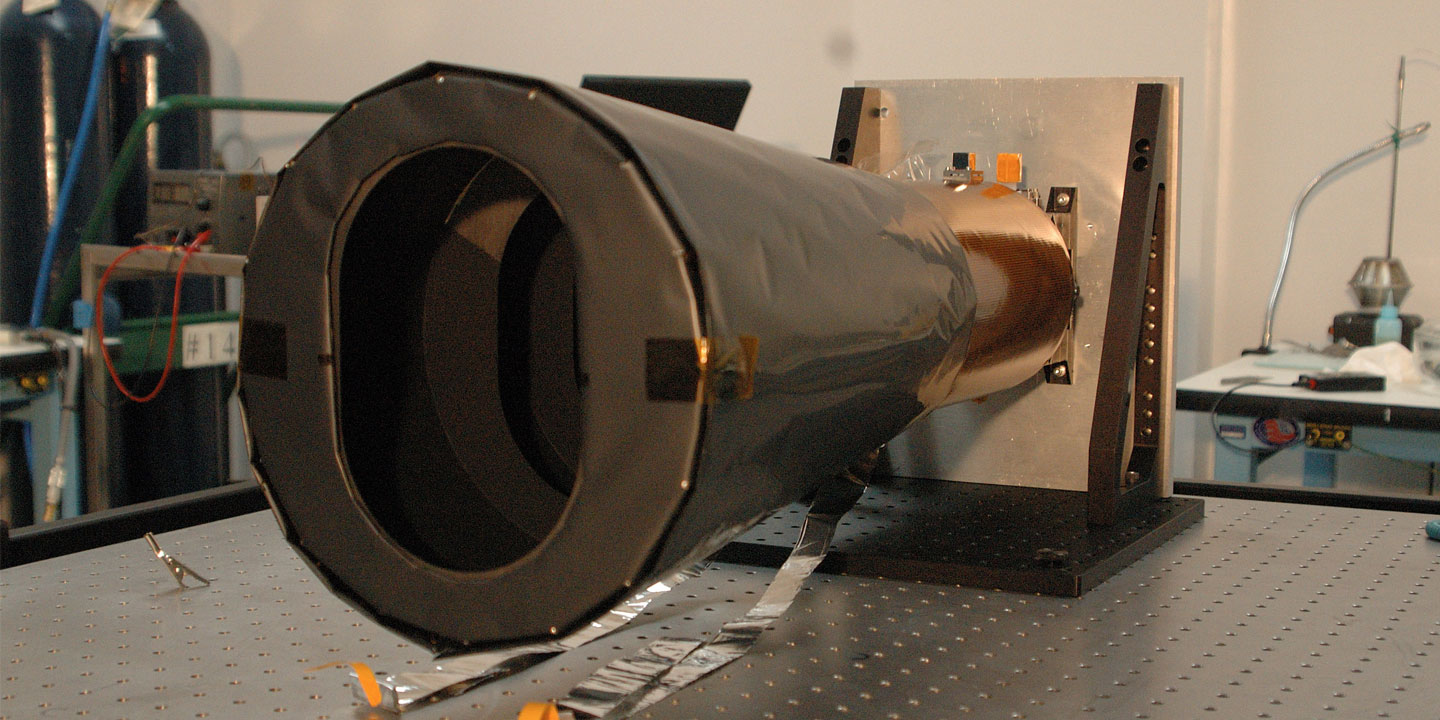
Context Camera (CTX)

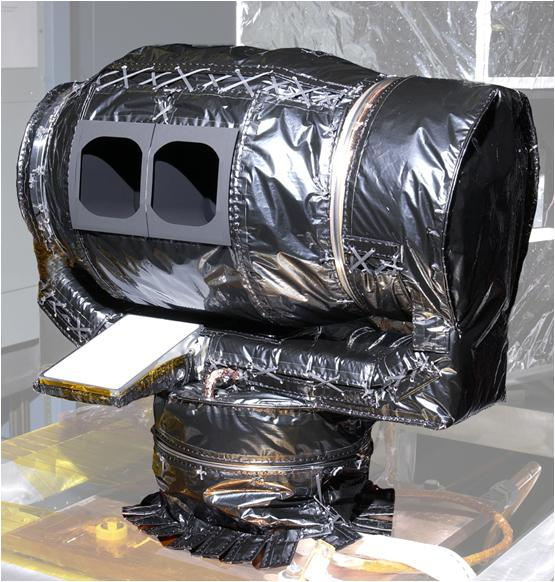
Mars Climate Sounder (MCS)

Three cameras, two spectrometers and a radar are included on the orbiter along with three engineering instruments and two "science-facility experiments", which use data from engineering subsystems to collect science data. Two of the engineering instruments are being used to test and demonstrate new equipment for future missions. The MRO takes around 29,000 images per year.

=== HiRISE ===
The High Resolution Imaging Science Experiment (HiRISE) camera is a 0.5 m (1 ft 8 in) reflecting telescope, the largest ever carried on a deep space mission, and has a resolution of 1 microradian, or 0.3 m (1 ft 0 in) from an altitude of 300 km (190 mi). In comparison, satellite images of Earth are generally available with a resolution of 0.5 m (1 ft 8 in). HiRISE collects images in three color bands, 400 to 600 nm (blue–green or B–G), 550 to 850 nm (red) and 800 to 1,000 nm (near infrared).

Red color images are 20,264 pixels across (6 km (3.7 mi) wide), and B–G and NIR are 4,048 pixels across (1.2 km (0.75 mi) wide). HiRISE's onboard computer reads these lines in time with the orbiter's ground speed, and images are potentially unlimited in length. Practically however, their length is limited by the computer's 28 Gb memory capacity, and the nominal maximum size is 20,000 × 40,000 pixels (800 megapixels) and 4,000 × 40,000 pixels (160 megapixels) for B–G and NIR images. Each 16.4 Gb image is compressed to 5 Gb before transmission and release to the general public on the HiRISE website in JPEG 2000 format. To facilitate the mapping of potential landing sites, HiRISE can produce stereo pairs of images from which topography can be calculated to an accuracy of 0.25 m (9.8 in). HiRISE was built by Ball Aerospace & Technologies Corp.

=== CTX ===
The Context Camera (CTX) provides grayscale images (500 to 800 nm) with a pixel resolution up to about 6 m (20 ft). CTX is designed to provide context maps for the targeted observations of HiRISE and CRISM, and is also used to mosaic large areas of Mars, monitor a number of locations for changes over time, and to acquire stereo (3D) coverage of key regions and potential future landing sites. The optics of CTX consist of a 350 mm (14 in) focal length Maksutov Cassegrain telescope with a 5,064 pixel wide line array CCD. The instrument takes pictures 30 km (19 mi) wide and has enough internal memory to store an image 160 km (99 mi) long before loading it into the main computer. The camera was built, and is operated by Malin Space Science Systems. CTX had mapped more than 99% of Mars by March 2017 and helped create an interactive map of Mars in 2023.

=== MARCI ===
The Mars Color Imager (MARCI) is a wide-angle, relatively low-resolution camera that views the surface of Mars in five visible and two ultraviolet bands. Each day, MARCI collects about 84 images and produces a global map with pixel resolutions of 1 to 10 km (0.62 to 6.21 mi). This map provides a weekly weather report for Mars, helps to characterize its seasonal and annual variations, and maps the presence of water vapor and ozone in its atmosphere. The camera was built and is operated by Malin Space Science Systems. It has a 180-degree fisheye lens with the seven color filters bonded directly on a single CCD sensor. The same MARCI camera was onboard Mars Climate Orbiter launched in 1998.

=== CRISM ===
The Compact Reconnaissance Imaging Spectrometer for Mars (CRISM) instrument is a visible and near infrared spectrometer that is used to produce detailed maps of the surface mineralogy of Mars. It operates from 362 to 3920 nm, measures the spectrum in 544 channels (each 6.55 nm wide), and has a resolution of 18 m (59 ft) at an altitude of 300 km (190 mi). CRISM is being used to identify minerals and chemicals indicative of the past or present existence of water on the surface of Mars. These materials include iron oxides, phyllosilicates, and carbonates, which have characteristic patterns in their visible-infrared energy. The CRISM instrument was shut down on April 3, 2023.

=== MCS ===
The Mars Climate Sounder (MCS) is a radiometer that looks both down and horizontally through the atmosphere in order to quantify the atmosphere's vertical variations. It has one visible/near infrared channel (0.3 to 3.0 μm) and eight far infrared (12 to 50 μm) channels selected for the purpose. MCS observes the atmosphere on the horizon of Mars (as viewed from MRO) by breaking it up into vertical slices and taking measurements within each slice in 5 km (3.1 mi) increments. These measurements are assembled into daily global weather maps to show the basic variables of Martian weather: temperature, pressure, humidity, and dust density. The MCS weighs roughly 9 kg (20 lb) and began operation in November 2006. Since beginning operation, it has helped create maps of mesospheric clouds, study and categorize dust storms, and provide direct evidence of carbon dioxide snow on Mars.

This instrument, supplied by NASA's Jet Propulsion Laboratory (JPL), is an updated version of a heavier, larger instrument originally developed at JPL for the 1992 Mars Observer and 1998 Mars Climate Orbiter missions, which both failed.

=== SHARAD ===
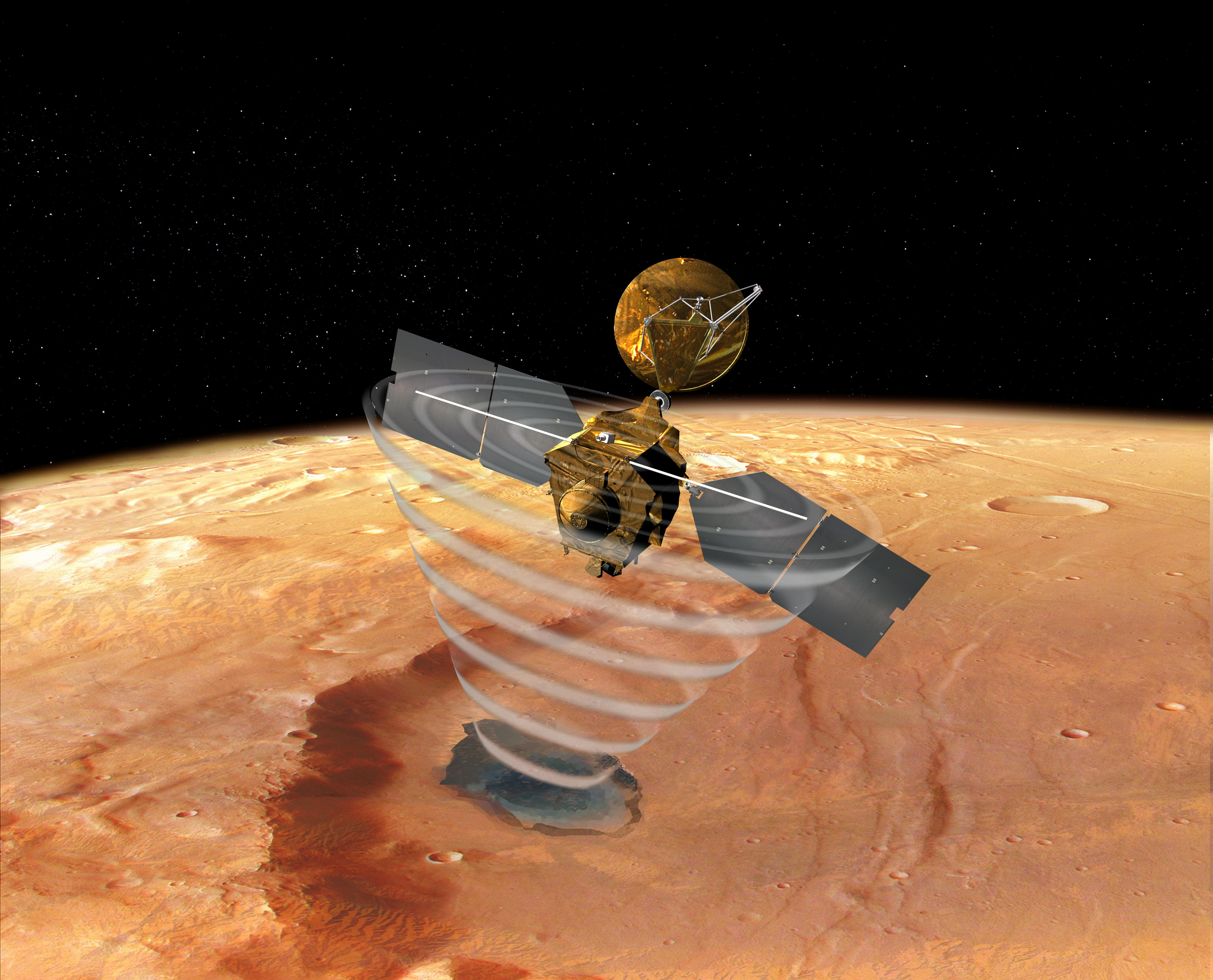
An artist's concept of MRO using SHARAD to "look" under the surface of Mars

The Shallow Radar (SHARAD) sounder experiment onboard MRO is designed to probe the internal structure of the Martian polar ice caps. It also gathers planet-wide information about underground layers of regolith, rock, and ice that might be accessible from the surface. SHARAD emits HF radio waves between 15 and 25 MHz, a range that allows it to resolve layers as thin as 7 m (23 ft) to a maximum depth of 3 km (1.864 mi). It has a horizontal resolution of 0.3 to 3 km (0.2 to 1.9 mi). SHARAD is designed to complement the Mars Express MARSIS instrument, which has coarser resolution but penetrates to a much greater depth. Both SHARAD and MARSIS were made by the Italian Space Agency.

=== Engineering instruments and experiments ===
In addition to its imaging equipment, MRO carries three engineering instruments. The Electra communications package is a UHF software-defined radio that provides a flexible platform for evolving relay capabilities. It is designed to communicate with other spacecraft as they approach, land, and operate on Mars. In addition to protocol controlled inter-spacecraft data links of 1 kbit/s to 2 Mbit/s, Electra also provides Doppler data collection, open loop recording and a highly accurate timing service based on an ultra-stable oscillator. Doppler information for approaching vehicles can be used for final descent targeting or descent and landing trajectory recreation. Doppler information on landed vehicles allows scientists to accurately determine the surface location of Mars landers and rovers. The two Mars Exploration Rover (MER) spacecraft utilized an earlier generation UHF relay radio providing similar functions through the Mars Odyssey orbiter. The Electra radio has relayed information to and from the MER spacecraft, Phoenix lander and Curiosity rover.

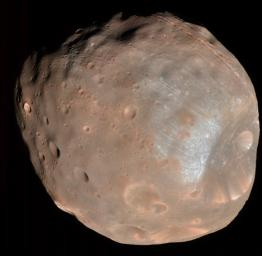
An image of Phobos taken by HiRISE on March 23, 2008, from a distance of around 6,800 kilometres (4,200 mi)

During the cruise phase, the MRO also used the K_{a} band Telecommunications Experiment Package to demonstrate a less power-intensive way to communicate with Earth.

The Optical Navigation Camera images the Martian moons, Phobos and Deimos, against background stars to precisely determine MRO's orbit. Although this is not critical, it was included as a technology test for future orbiting and landing of spacecraft. The Optical Navigation Camera was tested successfully in February and March 2006. It was subsequently turned off, but was turned back on in 2022 to collect data for a potential NASA-ESA Mars Sample Return mission.

Two additional science investigations are also on the spacecraft. The Gravity Field Investigation Package measures variations in the Martian gravitational field through variations in the spacecraft's speed. Speed changes are detected by measuring doppler shifts in MRO's radio signals received on Earth. Data from this investigation can be used to understand the subsurface geology of Mars, determine the density of the atmosphere and track seasonal changes in the location of carbon dioxide deposited on the surface. Due to decreased budgets, data collection ended in 2022.

The Atmospheric Structure Investigation used sensitive onboard accelerometers to deduce the in situ atmospheric density of Mars during aerobraking. The measurements helped provide greater understanding of seasonal wind variations, the effects of dust storms, and the structure of the atmosphere.

== Spacecraft systems ==
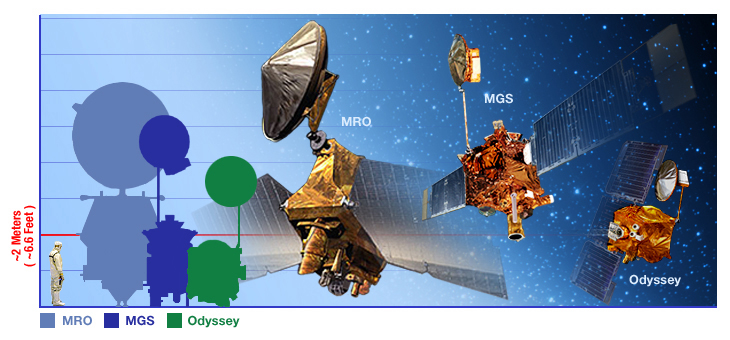
Size comparison of MRO with predecessors

=== Structure ===
Workers at Lockheed Martin Space Systems in Denver assembled the spacecraft structure and attached the instruments. Instruments were constructed at the Jet Propulsion Laboratory, the University of Arizona Lunar and Planetary Laboratory in Tucson, Arizona, Johns Hopkins University Applied Physics Laboratory in Laurel, Maryland, the Italian Space Agency in Rome, and Malin Space Science Systems in San Diego.

The structure is made mostly of carbon composites and aluminum-honeycombed plates. The titanium fuel tank takes up most of the volume and mass of the spacecraft and provides most of its structural integrity. The spacecraft's total mass is less than 2,180 kg (4,810 lb) with an unfueled dry mass less than 1,031 kg (2,273 lb).

=== Power systems ===
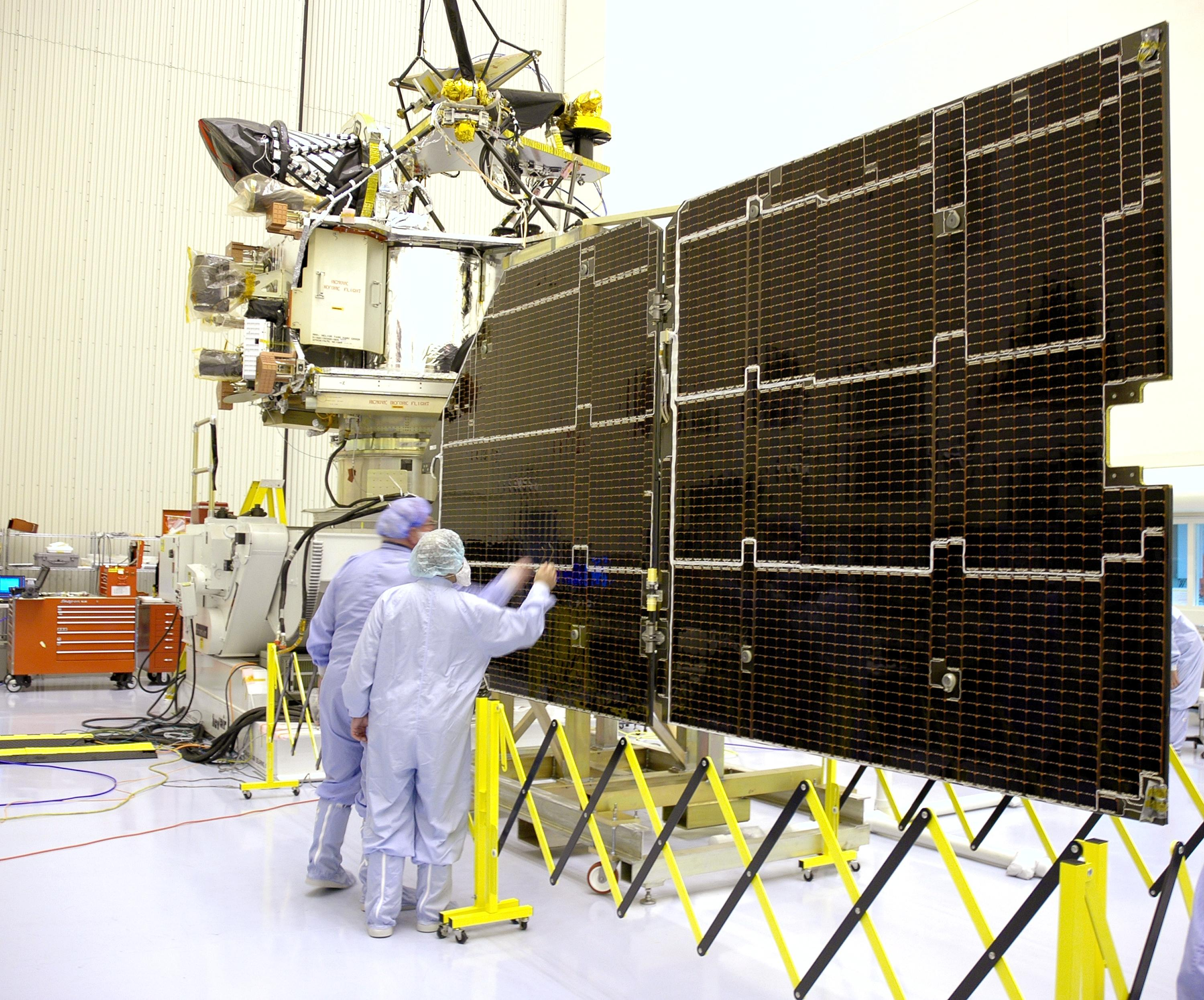
The MRO solar panel

MRO gets all of its electrical power from two solar panels, each of which can move independently around two axes (up-down, or left-right rotation). Each solar panel measures 5.35 m × 2.53 m (17.6 ft × 8.3 ft) and has 9.5 m^{2} (102 sq ft) covered with 3,744 individual photovoltaic cells. Its high-efficiency solar cells are able to convert more than 26% of the energy it receives from the Sun directly into electricity and are connected together to produce a total output of 32 volts. Whilst orbiting Mars, the panels together produce 600–2000 (Note: Various figures are given for the power, ranging from 600 W to 2000 W at the aphelion to 1000 W at an unspecified location in the MRO's orbit. Due to the conflicting information from reliable sources, a range has been used, instead of an exact number.) watts of power; in contrast, the panels would generate 6,000 watts in a comparable Earth orbit by being closer to the Sun.

MRO has two rechargeable nickel-hydrogen batteries used to power the spacecraft when it is not facing the Sun. Each battery has an energy storage capacity of 50 ampere hours (180 kC). The full range of the batteries cannot be used due to voltage constraints on the spacecraft, but allows the operators to extend the battery life—a valuable capability, given that battery drain is one of the most common causes of long-term satellite failure. Planners anticipate that only 40% of the batteries' capacities will be required during the lifetime of the spacecraft.

=== Electronic systems ===
MRO's main computer is a 133 MHz, 10.4 million transistor, 32-bit, RAD750 processor, a radiation-hardened version of a PowerPC 750 or G3 processor with a purpose-built motherboard. The operating system software is VxWorks and has extensive fault protection protocols and monitoring.

Data is stored in a 160 Gbit (20 GB) flash memory module consisting of over 700 memory chips, each with a 256 Mbit capacity. This memory capacity is not actually that large considering the amount of data to be acquired; for example, a single image from the HiRISE camera can be as large as 28 Gb.

=== Telecommunications system ===
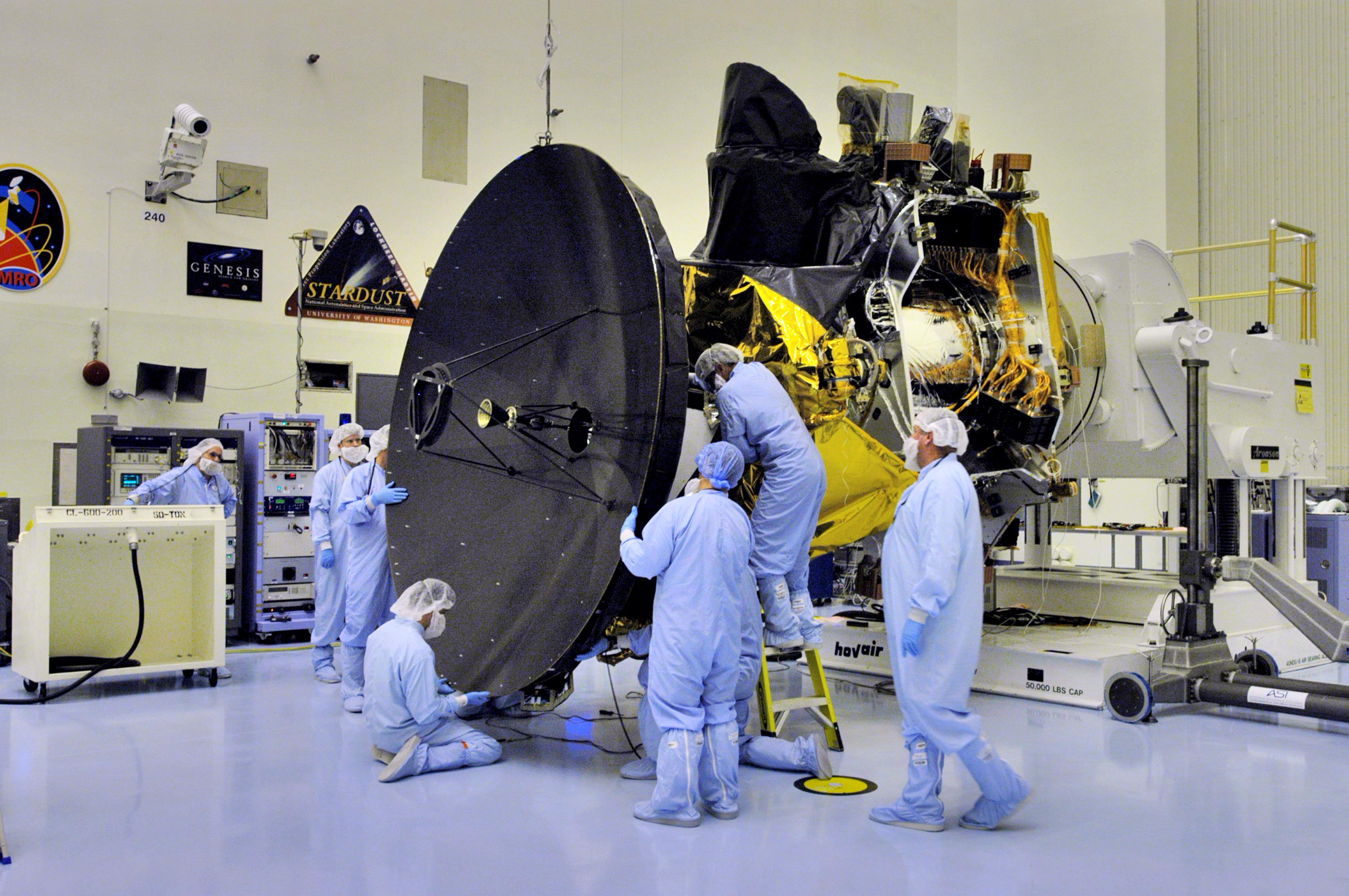
MRO High Gain Antenna installation

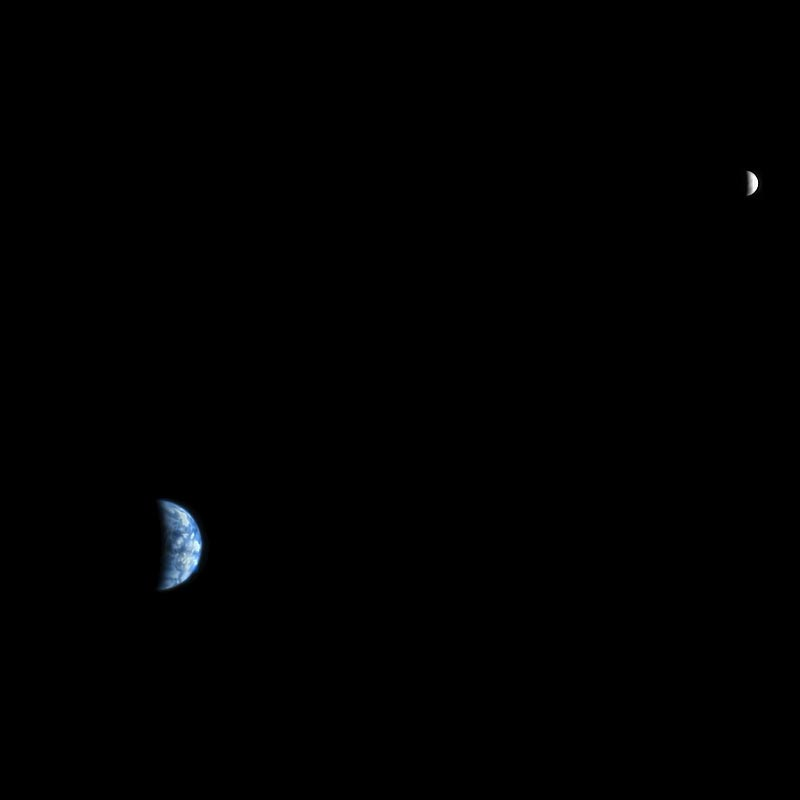
MRO views Earth and the Moon roughly to scale from Mars orbit.

When it was launched, the Telecom Subsystem on MRO was the best digital communication system sent into deep space, and for the first time used capacity-approaching turbo-codes. It was more powerful than any previous deep space mission, and is able to transmit data more than ten times faster than previous Mars missions. Along with the Electra communications package, the system consists of a very large (3 m (9.8 ft)) High Gain Antenna, which is used to transmit data to the Deep Space Network on Earth via X-band frequencies at 8.41 GHz. It also demonstrates the use of the K_{a} band at 32 GHz for higher data rates. Maximum transmission speed from Mars can be as high as 6 Mbit/s, but averages between 0.5 and 4 Mbit/s. The spacecraft carries two 100-watt X-band Travelling Wave Tube Amplifiers (TWTA) (one of which is a backup), one 35-watt K_{a}-band amplifier, and two Small Deep Space Transponders (SDSTs).

Two smaller low-gain antennas are also present for lower-rate communication during emergencies and special events. These antennas do not have focusing dishes and can transmit and receive from any direction. They are an important backup system to ensure that MRO can always be reached, even if its main antenna is pointed away from the Earth.

The K_{a} band subsystem was used to show how such a system could be used by spacecraft in the future. Due to lack of spectrum at 8.41 GHz X-band, future high-rate deep space missions will use 32 GHz K_{a}-band. NASA Deep Space Network (DSN) implemented K_{a}-band receiving capabilities at all three of its complexes (Goldstone, Canberra and Madrid) over its 34-m beam-waveguide (BWG) antenna subnet. K_{a}-band tests were also planned during the science phase, but during aerobraking a switch failed, limiting the X-band high gain antenna to a single amplifier. If this amplifier fails all high-speed X-band communications will be lost. The K_{a} downlink is the only remaining backup for this functionality, and since the K_{a}-band capability of one of the SDST transponders has already failed, (and the other might have the same problem) JPL decided to halt all K_{a}-band demonstrations and hold the remaining capability in reserve.

By November 2013, the MRO had passed 200 terabits in the amount of science data returned. The data returned by the mission is more than three times the total data returned via NASA's Deep Space Network for all the other missions managed by NASA's Jet Propulsion Laboratory over the past 10 years.

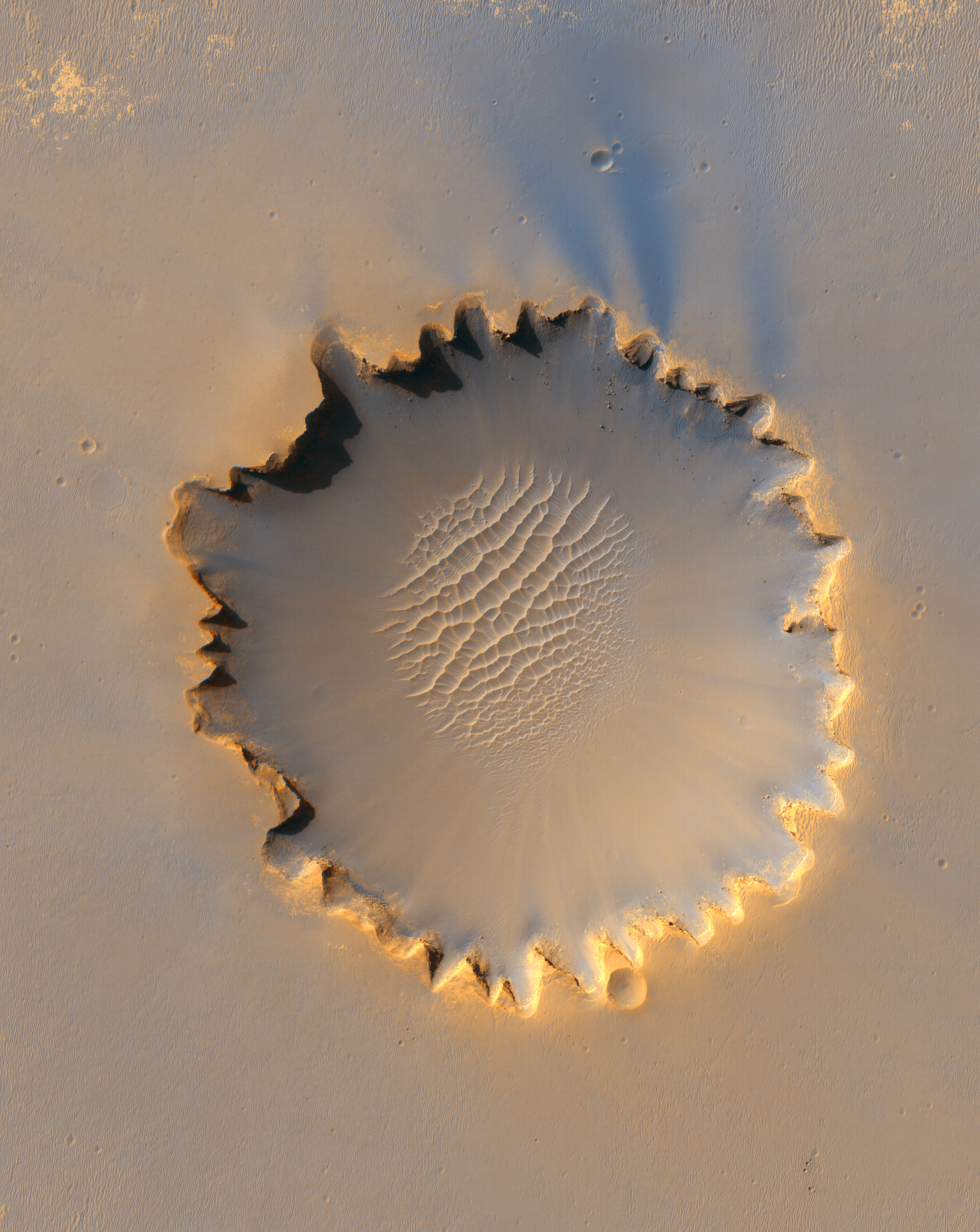
High-resolution image of Victoria crater from HiRISE on October 3, 2006. The rover Opportunity can be seen at roughly the "ten o'clock" position along the rim of the crater.

=== Propulsion and attitude control ===
The spacecraft uses a 1,175 L (258 imp gal; 310 US gal) fuel tank filled with 1,187 kg (2,617 lb) of hydrazine monopropellant. Fuel pressure is regulated by adding pressurized helium gas from an external tank. Seventy percent of the propellant was used for orbital insertion, and it has enough propellant to keep functioning into the 2030s.

MRO has 20 rocket engine thrusters on board. Six large thrusters each produce 170 N (38 lb_{f}) of thrust for a total of 1,020 N (230 lb_{f}) meant mainly for orbital insertion. These thrusters were originally designed for the Mars Surveyor 2001 Lander. Six medium thrusters each produce 22 N (4.9 lb_{f}) of thrust for trajectory correction maneuvers and attitude control during orbit insertion. Finally, eight small thrusters each produce 0.9 N (0.20 lb_{f}) of thrust for attitude control during normal operations.

Four reaction wheels are also used for precise attitude control during activities requiring a highly stable platform, such as high-resolution imaging, in which even small motions can cause blurring of the image. Each wheel is used for one axis of motion. The fourth wheel is a backup in case one of the other three wheels fails. Each wheel weighs 10 kg (22 lb) and can be spun as fast as 100 Hz or 6,000 rpm.

In order to determine the spacecraft's orbit and facilitate maneuvers, 16 Sun sensors – eight primaries and eight backups – are placed around the spacecraft to calibrate solar direction relative to the orbiter's frame. Two star trackers, digital cameras used to map the position of catalogued stars, provide NASA with full, three-axis knowledge of the spacecraft orientation and attitude. A primary and backup Miniature Inertial Measurement Unit (MIMU), provided by Honeywell, measures changes to the spacecraft attitude as well as any non-gravitationally induced changes to its linear velocity. Each MIMU is a combination of three accelerometers and three ring-laser gyroscopes. These systems are all critically important to MRO, as it must be able to point its camera to a very high precision in order to take the high-quality pictures that the mission requires. It has also been specifically designed to minimize any vibrations on the spacecraft, so as to allow its instruments to take images without any distortions caused by vibrations.

== Cost ==
MRO development and prime mission costs, by fiscal year

The total cost of the MRO through the end of its prime mission was $716.6 million. Of this amount, $416.6 million was spent on spacecraft development, approximately $90 million for its launch, and $210 million for 5 years of mission operations. Since 2011, MRO's annual operations costs are, on average, $31 million per year, when adjusted for inflation. The MRO's science budget has, like other long term missions, been declining, leading to reduced science activity.

== Discoveries ==
=== Ice ===
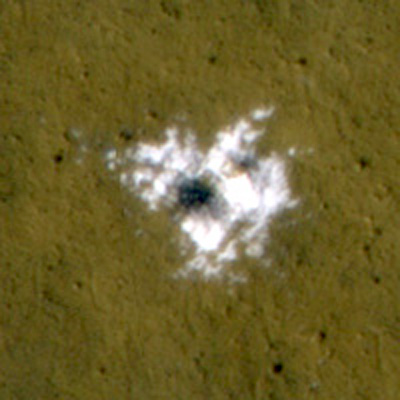
Water ice excavated by an impact crater that formed between January and September 2008. The ice was identified spectroscopically using CRISM.

An article in the journal Science in September 2009, reported that some new craters on Mars have excavated relatively pure water ice. After being exposed, the ice gradually fades as it sublimates away. These new craters were found and dated by the CTX camera, and the identification of the ice was confirmed using CRISM. The ice was found in a five locations, three of which were in the Cebrenia quadrangle. These locations are 55.57°N 150.62°E; 43.28°N 176.9°E; and 45°N 164.5°E. Two others are in the Diacria quadrangle: 46.7°N 176.8°E and 46.33°N 176.9°E.

Radar results from SHARAD suggested that features termed lobate debris aprons (LDAs) contain large amounts of water ice. Of interest from the days of the Viking Orbiters, these LDA are aprons of material surrounding cliffs. They have a convex topography and a gentle slope; this suggests flow away from the steep source cliff. In addition, lobate debris aprons can show surface lineations just as rock glaciers on the Earth. SHARAD has provided strong evidence that the LDAs in Hellas Planitia are glaciers that are covered with a thin layer of debris (i.e. rocks and dust); a strong reflection from the top and base of LDAs was observed, suggesting that pure water ice makes up the bulk of the formation (between the two reflections). Based on the experiments of the Phoenix lander and the studies of the Mars Odyssey from orbit, water ice is known to exist just under the surface of Mars in the far north and south (high latitudes).

=== Chloride deposits and aqueous minerals ===
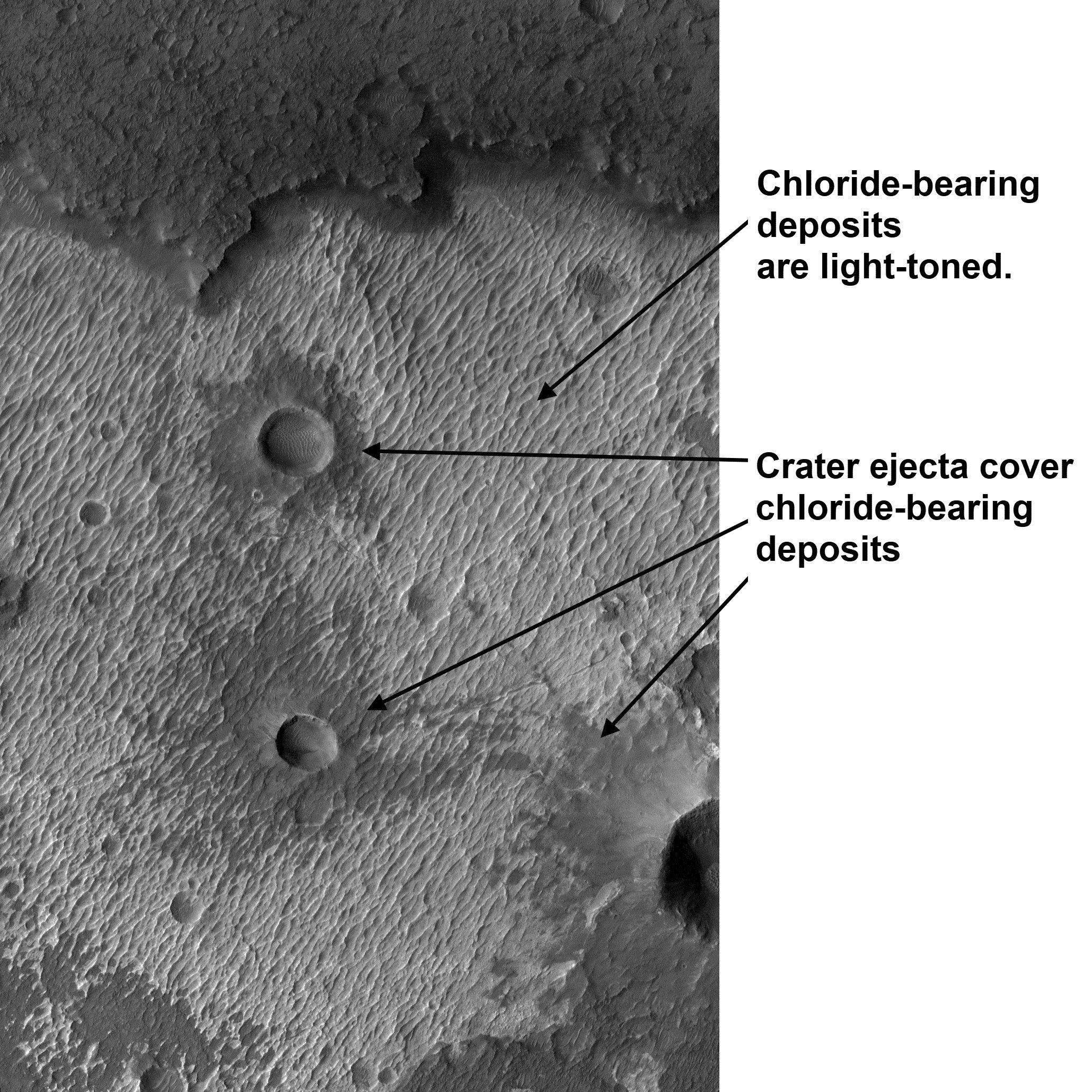
Chloride deposits in Terra Sirenum

Using data from Mars Global Surveyor, Mars Odyssey, and the MRO, scientists have found widespread deposits of chloride minerals. Evidence suggests that the deposits were formed from the evaporation of mineral enriched waters. The research suggests that lakes may have been scattered over large areas of the Martian surface. Usually, chlorides are the last minerals to come out of solution. Carbonates, sulfates, and silica should precipitate out ahead of them. Sulfates and silica have been found by the Mars rovers on the surface. Places with chloride minerals may have once held various life forms. Furthermore, such areas could preserve traces of ancient life.

In 2009, a group of scientists from the CRISM team reported on nine to ten different classes of minerals formed in the presence of water. Different types of clays (also called phyllosilicates) were found in many locations. The phyllosilicates identified included aluminum smectite, iron/magnesium smectite, kaolinite, prehnite, and chlorite. Rocks containing carbonate were found around the Isidis basin. Carbonates belong to one class in which life could have developed. Areas around Valles Marineris were found to contain hydrated silica and hydrated sulfates. The researchers identified hydrated sulfates and ferric minerals in Terra Meridiani and in Valles Marineris. Other minerals found on Mars were jarosite, alunite, hematite, opal, and gypsum. Two to five of the mineral classes were formed with the right pH and sufficient water to permit life to grow.

=== Recurring slope lineae ===
Images from HiRISE showing the appearance of dark marks on the floor of Valles Marineris. Images taken at various times in the year.

On August 4, 2011 (sol 2125), NASA announced that MRO had detected dark streaks on slopes, known as recurring slope lineae caused by what appeared to be flowing salty water on the surface or subsurface of Mars. On September 28, 2015, this finding was confirmed at a special NASA news conference. In 2017, however, further research suggested that the dark streaks were created by grains of sand and dust slipping down slopes, and not water darkening the ground.

== See also ==
- Exploration of Mars
- Geography of Mars – Delineation and characterization of Martian regions
- HiWish program – NASA program for public suggestions for MRO images
